This page describes and summarizes the year 2023 in world sporting events.

High-profile events this year include the 2023 Cricket World Cup, 2023 Rugby World Cup and the 2023 FIFA Women's World Cup.

Most of the major Continental multi-sports events – the Pan American, European, Asian and Pacific Games – are held this year, one year ahead of the 2024 Summer Olympics in Paris, in addition to the Francophone Games. 2023 sees the first combined cycling world championships, including all disciplines except Cyclo-cross, and the first mixed-sex United Cup in tennis.

Calendar by month

January

February

March

April

May

June

July

August

September

October

November

December

Multi-sport events
 January 12–22: 2023 Winter World University Games in  Lake Placid
    ;  
 January 21–28: 2023 European Youth Olympic Winter Festival in  Friuli Venezia Giulia
  ;  ;  
 January 29 – February 4: 2023 Arctic Winter Games in / Wood Buffalo
  ;  ;  
 May 5–17: 2023 Southeast Asian Games in  Phnom Penh
 May 12–20: 2023 Asia Pacific Masters Games in  North Jeolla Province
 May 28 – June 3: 2023 Games of the Small States of Europe in  Valletta
 June 17–25: 2023 Special Olympics World Summer Games in  Berlin
 June 21 – July 2: 2023 European Games in  Kraków & Małopolska
 June 23 – July 8: 2023 Central American and Caribbean Games in  San Salvador
 June 24–30: 2023 African Beach Games in  Hammamet
 June 26 – July 9: 2023 European Masters Games in  Tampere
 July 8–14: 2023 Island Games in 
 July 22 – August 1: 2023 Micronesian Games in  Majuro
 July 23–29: 2023 European Youth Summer Olympic Festival in  Maribor
 July 28 – August 6: 2023 World Police and Fire Games in  Winnipeg
 July 28 – August 6: 2022 Jeux de la Francophonie in  Kinshasa
 July 28 – August 8: 2021 Summer World University Games in  Chengdu
 August 4–11: 2023 Commonwealth Youth Games in  Port of Spain
 August 4–19: 2023 African Games in  Accra
 August 5–12: 2023 World Beach Games in  Bali
 September 2–9: 2023 Mediterranean Beach Games in  Heraklion
 September 23 – October 8: 2022 Asian Games in  Hangzhou
 October 20 – November 5: 2023 Pan American Games in  Santiago
 October 21–30: 2023 World Combat Games in  Riyadh
 October 22–28: 2022 Asian Para Games in  Hangzhou
 November 17–26: 2021 Asian Indoor and Martial Arts Games in  Bangkok and Chonburi
 November 19 – December 2: 2023 Pacific Games in  Honiara
 TBD: 2023 Military World Games in  Bogotá
 TBD: 2023 Indian Ocean Island Games in  Antananarivo
 TBD: 2023 Asian Beach Games in  Sanya
 TBD: 2023 South American Beach Games in  Santa Marta

Air sports

World championships
 March 19 – 25: 2023 FAI F3P World Championships in  Jonava
 April 21–23: 2023 World Indoor Skydiving Championships in  Liptovský Mikuláš
 May 20 – June 3: 2023 World Paragliding Championships in  Chamoux-sur-Gelon
 July 1–15: 2023 World Women's Gliding Championships in  Garray
 July 26 – August 5: 2023 World Glider Aerobatics Championships in  Pociūnai Airfield
 July 29 – August 5: 2023 World Rally Flying Championships in  Mâcon
 August 6–19: 2023 World Hang Gliding Championships in  Kruševo
 August 22–27: 2023 World Junior Hot Air Ballooning Championships in  Grudziądz
 September 2–9: 2023 World Women's Hot Air Ballooing Championships in  Northam
 October 20–28: 2023 World Paragliding Accuracy Championships in  Sopot
 October 24 – November 4: 2023 World Advanced Aerobatics Championships in  Las Vegas
 December 2–16: 2023 World Gliding Championships in  Narromine

Alpine skiing

Alpine Skiing World Championships
 January 19–25: World Junior Alpine Skiing Championships 2023 in  St Anton am Arlberg
 February 6–19: FIS Alpine World Ski Championships 2023 in  Courchevel–Méribel

Alpine Skiing World Cup

October 2022
 October 22 & 23: World Cup #1 in  Sölden
 The Women's Giant Slalom event was cancelled.
 Men's Giant Slalom winner:  Marco Odermatt
 October 26–30: World Cup #2 in  Zermatt
 The two Men's Downhill events are cancelled.

November 2022
 November 2–6: World Cup #3 in  Breuil-Cervinia
 The two Women's Downhill events are cancelled.
 November 12 & 13: World Cup #4 in  Lech–Zürs
 Both Parallel events are cancelled.
 November 19 & 20: World Cup #5 in  Levi
 Women's Slalom winner:  Mikaela Shiffrin (2 times)
 November 22–27: World Cup #6 in  Lake Louise Ski Resort #1
 One of the Men's Super G events was cancelled.
 Men's Downhill winner:  Aleksander Aamodt Kilde
 Men's Super G winner:  Marco Odermatt
 November 26 & 27: World Cup #7 in  Killington Ski Resort
 Women's Giant Slalom winner:  Lara Gut-Behrami
 Women's Slalom winner:  Anna Swenn-Larsson
 November 29 – December 4: World Cup #8 in  Beaver Creek Resort
 One of the Men's Downhill events was cancelled.
 Men's Downhill & Super G winner:  Aleksander Aamodt Kilde
 November 29 – December 4: World Cup #9 in  Lake Louise Ski Resort #2
 Women's Downhill winner:  Sofia Goggia (2 times)
 Women's Super G winner:  Corinne Suter

December 2022
 December 10 & 11: World Cup #10 in  Val-d'Isère
 Men's Giant Slalom winner:  Marco Odermatt
 Men's Slalom winner:  Lucas Braathen
 December 10 & 11: World Cup #11 in  Sestriere
 Women's Giant Slalom winner:  Marta Bassino
 Women's Slalom winner:  Wendy Holdener
 December 14–17: World Cup #12 in  Val Gardena
 The Men's Super G event was cancelled.
 Men's Downhill winners:  Vincent Kriechmayr (#1) /  Aleksander Aamodt Kilde (#2)
 December 14–18: World Cup #13 in  St. Moritz
 Women's Downhill winners:  Elena Curtoni (#1) /  Sofia Goggia (#2)
 Women's Super G winner:  Mikaela Shiffrin
 December 18 & 19: World Cup #14 in  Alta Badia
 Men's Giant Slalom winners:  Lucas Braathen (#1) /  Marco Odermatt (#2)
 December 22: World Cup #15 in  Madonna di Campiglio
 Men's Slalom winner:  Daniel Yule
 December 26–29: World Cup #16 in  Bormio
 Men's Downhill winner:  Vincent Kriechmayr
 Men's Super G winner:  Marco Odermatt
 December 27–29: World Cup #17 in  Semmering
 Women's Giant Slalom & Slalom winner:  Mikaela Shiffrin (3 times)

January 2023
 January 4: World Cup #18 in  Garmisch-Partenkirchen #1
 Men's Slalom winner:  Henrik Kristoffersen
 January 4 & 5: World Cup #19 in  Zagreb
 One of the Women's Slalom events was cancelled.
 Women's Slalom winner:  Mikaela Shiffrin
 January 7 & 8: World Cup #20 in  Adelboden
 Men's Giant Slalom winner:  Marco Odermatt
 Men's Slalom winner:  Lucas Braathen
 January 7 & 8: World Cup #21 in  Kranjska Gora #1
 Women's Giant Slalom winners:  Valérie Grenier (#1) /  Mikaela Shiffrin (#2)
 January 10: World Cup #22 in  Flachau
 Women's Slalom winner:  Petra Vlhová
 January 10–15: World Cup #23 in  Wengen
 Men's Super G & Downhill winner:  Aleksander Aamodt Kilde
 Men's Slalom winner:  Henrik Kristoffersen
 January 12–15: World Cup #24 in  St Anton am Arlberg
 Women's Super G winners:  Federica Brignone (#1) /  Lara Gut-Behrami (#2)
 January 17–22: World Cup #25 in  Kitzbühel
 Men's Downhill winners:  Vincent Kriechmayr (#1) /  Aleksander Aamodt Kilde (#2)
 Men's Slalom winner:  Daniel Yule
 January 18–22: World Cup #26 in  Cortina d'Ampezzo #1
 Women's Downhill winners:  Sofia Goggia (#1) /  Ilka Štuhec (#2)
 Women's Super G winner:  Ragnhild Mowinckel
 January 24 & 25: World Cup #27 in  Schladming
 Men's Giant Slalom winner:  Loïc Meillard
 Men's Slalom winner:  Clément Noël
 January 24 & 25: World Cup #28 in  Kronplatz
 Women's Giant Slalom winner:  Mikaela Shiffrin (2 times)
 January 26–29: World Cup #29 in  Garmisch-Partenkirchen #2
 The Men's Downhill event was cancelled. 
 January 28 & 29: World Cup #30 in  Špindlerův Mlýn
 Women's Slalom winners:  Mikaela Shiffrin (#1) /  Lena Dürr (#2)
 January 28 & 29: World Cup #31 in  Cortina d'Ampezzo #2
 Men's Super G winner:  Marco Odermatt (2 times)

February 2023
 February 4: World Cup #32 in  Chamonix
 Men's Slalom winner:  Ramon Zenhäusern
 February 23–26: World Cup #33 in  Crans-Montana
 The Women's Super G event was cancelled.
 Women's Downhill winner:  Sofia Goggia
 February 25 & 26: World Cup #34 in  Palisades Tahoe
 Men's Giant Slalom winner:  Marco Schwarz
 Men's Slalom winner:  Alexander Steen Olsen

March 2023
 March 1–5: World Cup #35 in  Aspen
 One of the Men's Downhill events was cancelled.
 Men's Downhill winner: 
 Men's Super G winner: 
 March 1–5: World Cup #36 in  Kvitfjell
 Women's Super G winners: (#1) / (#2)
 Women's Downhill winner: 
 March 10 & 11: World Cup #37 in  Åre ski resort
 Women's Giant Slalom winner: 
 Women's Slalom winner: 
 March 11 & 12: World Cup #38 in  Kranjska Gora #2
 Men's Giant Slalom winners: (#1) / (#2)
 March 13–19: World Cup #39 (final) in  Soldeu
 Downhill winners: (m) / (f)
 Super G winners: (m) / (f)
 Giant Slalom winners: (m) / (f)
 Slalom winners: (m) / (f)
 Team Parallel winners:

Alpine Skiing European Cup
 November 28 & 29, 2022: EC #1 in  Mayrhofen (Women's only)
 Giant Slalom winner:  Doriane Escané
 Slalom winner:  Moa Boström Müssener
 December 1 & 2, 2022: EC #2 in  Zinal (Women's only)
 Super G winners:  Karen Smadja-Clément (1st) /  Janine Schmitt (2nd)
 December 1 & 2, 2022: EC #3 in  Obergurgl (Men's only)
 Giant Slalom winners:  Josua Mettler (1st) /  Sam Maes (2nd)
 December 5 & 6, 2022: EC #4 in  Zinal (Women's only)
 Giant Slalom winners:  Asja Zenere (1st) /  Jessica Hilzinger (2nd)
 December 6 & 7, 2022: EC #5 in  Santa Caterina di Valfurva (Men's only)
 Super G winners:  Josua Mettler (1st) /  Andreas Ploier (2nd)
 December 12 & 13, 2022: EC #6 in  Zinal (Men's only)
 Giant Slalom winners:  Livio Simonet (2 times)
 December 13 & 14, 2022: EC #7 in  Ponte di Legno (Women's only)
 Giant Slalom winners:  Asja Zenere (2 times)
 December 15, 2022: EC #8 in  Obereggen (Men's only)
 Slalom winner:  Steven Amiez
 December 16, 2022: EC #9 in  Val di Fassa (Men's only)
 Slalom winner:  Alex Vinatzer
 December 16 & 17, 2022: EC #10 in  Valle Aurina (Women's only)
 Slalom winners:  Paula Moltzan (1st) /  Nicole Good (2nd)
 December 19–22, 2022: EC #11 in  St. Moritz (Men's only)
 Downhill winner:  Cameron Alexander (2 times)

Alpine Skiing North American Cup
 November 30 – December 3, 2022: NAC #1 in  Copper Mountain (Women's only)
 Giant Slalom winner:  Britt Richardson (2 times)
 Slalom winners:  Allie Resnick (1st) /  Kiki Alexander (2nd)
 December 5–10, 2022: NAC #2 in  Copper Mountain
 Men's Downhill winners:  Sam Morse (1st) /  Erik Arvidsson (2nd)
 Women's Downhill winner:  Patricia Mangan (2 times)
 Men's Super G winners:  Kyle Negomir (2 times)
 Women's Super G winners:  Kiki Alexander (2 times)
 December 12–15, 2022: NAC #3 in  Beaver Creek (Men's only)
 Giant Slalom winners:  Jacob Dilling (1st) /  Cooper Cornelius (2nd)
 Slalom winners:  Jimmy Krupka (2nd) /  Justin Alkier (2nd)

Alpine Skiing South American Cup
 August 5–7, 2022: SAC #1 in  Chapelco
 Giant Slalom winners:  Nicolás Pirozzi (m) /  Lara Colturi (f)
 August 9–13, 2022: SAC #2 in  Cerro Catedral
 Giant Slalom winners:  Andres Figueroa (m) /  Lara Colturi (f)
 Slalom #1 winners:  Andres Figueroa (m) /  Francesca Baruzzi (f)
 Slalom #2 winners:  Andres Figueroa (m) /  Lara Colturi (f)
 August 27, 2022: SAC #3 in  El Colorado
 Giant Slalom winners:  Delfin Van Ditmar (m) /  Lara Colturi (f)
 August 28, 2022: SAC #4 in  La Parva
 Slalom winners:  Akira Sasaki (m) /  Lara Colturi (f)
 August 29 – September 2, 2022: SAC #5 in  La Parva
 Downhill #1 winners:  Miha Hrobat (m) /  Vanessa Nußbaumer (f)
 Downhill #2 winners:  Jacob Schramm (m) /  Sabrina Maier (f)
 Super G #1 winners:  Johan Clarey (m) /  Patricia Mangan (f)
 Super G #2 winners:  Cyprien Sarrazin (m) /  Patricia Mangan (f)
 Alpine Combined winners:  Henrik von Appen (m) /  Lara Colturi (f)
 September 12–16, 2022: SAC #6 in  Cerro Castor
 Men's Giant Slalom winners:  Giovanni Borsotti (1st) /  Alex Vinatzer (2nd)
 Women's Giant Slalom winners:  Sara Hector (1st) /  Hilma Lövblom (2nd)
 Men's Slalom winners:  Juan del Campo (1st) /  Joaquim Salarich (2nd)
 Women's Slalom winners:  Hanna Aronsson Elfman (1st) /  Chiara Pogneaux (2nd)
 September 26 – October 1, 2022: SAC #7 in  Corralco
 Downhill #1 winners:  Henrik von Appen (m) /  Malin Sofie Sund (f)
 Downhill #2 winners:  Henrik von Appen (m) /  Malin Sofie Sund (f)
 Alpine Combined winners:  Tiziano Gravier (m) /  Malin Sofie Sund (f)
 Super G winners:  Henrik von Appen (m) /  Malin Sofie Sund (f)
 Here first two Alpine combined competitions are cancelled.

Alpine Skiing Australia/New Zealand Cup
 August 22–30, 2022: ANC #1 in  Coronet Peak
 Slalom #1 winners:  Isaiah Nelson (m) /  Katie Hensien (f)
 Slalom #2 winners:  Benjamin Ritchie (m) /  Zoe Zimmermann (f)
 Super G #1 winners:  Willis Feasey (m) /  Candace Crawford (f)
 Super G #2 winners:  Willis Feasey (m) /  Candace Crawford (f)
 Giant Slalom #1 winners:  Isaiah Nelson (m) /  Candace Crawford (f)
 Giant Slalom #2 winners:  Andreas Žampa (m) /  Alice Robinson (f)

American football

National Football League
 February 5: 2023 Pro Bowl in  Paradise
 February 12: Super Bowl LVII in  Glendale
 April 27–29: 2023 NFL Draft in  Kansas City
 September 7, 2023 – January 7, 2024: 2023 NFL season

United States Football League
 April 15 – June 2023: 2023 USFL season

XFL
 February 18 – April 29: 2023 XFL season
 May 13: XFL Championship

2022–23 NCAA football bowl games

College Football Playoff and National Championship Game
 December 30, 2022: 2022 Orange Bowl in  Miami Gardens
 The  Tennessee Volunteers defeated the  Clemson Tigers, 31–14.
 December 31, 2022: 2022 Sugar Bowl in  New Orleans
 The  Alabama Crimson Tide defeated the  Kansas State Wildcats, 45–20.
 December 31, 2022: 2022 Peach Bowl in  Atlanta
 The  Georgia Bulldogs defeated the  Ohio State Buckeyes, 42–41.
 December 31, 2022: 2022 Fiesta Bowl in  Glendale
 The  TCU Horned Frogs defeated the  Michigan Wolverines, 51–45.
 January 2: 2023 Cotton Bowl Classic in  Arlington
 The  Tulane Green Wave defeated the  USC Trojans, 46–45.
 January 2: 2023 Rose Bowl in  Pasadena
 The  Penn State Nittany Lions defeated the  Utah Utes, 35–21.
 January 9: 2023 College Football Playoff National Championship in  Inglewood
 The  Georgia Bulldogs defeated the  TCU Horned Frogs, 65–7, to win their second consecutive National Championship.

Non–CFP bowl games
 December 16, 2022: 2022 Bahamas Bowl in  Nassau
 The  UAB Blazers defeated the  Miami RedHawks, 24–20.
 December 16, 2022: 2022 Cure Bowl in  Orlando
 The  Troy Trojans defeated the  UTSA Roadrunners, 18–12.
 December 17, 2022: 2022 Fenway Bowl in  Boston
 The  Louisville Cardinals defeated the  Cincinnati Bearcats, 24–7.
 December 17, 2022: 2022 New Mexico Bowl in  Albuquerque
 The  BYU Cougars defeated the  SMU Mustangs, 24–23.
 December 17, 2022: 2022 LA Bowl in  Inglewood
 The  Fresno State Bulldogs defeated the  Washington State Cougars, 29–6.
 December 17, 2022: 2022 LendingTree Bowl in  Mobile
 The  Southern Miss Golden Eagles defeated the  Rice Owls, 38–24.
 December 17, 2022: 2022 Las Vegas Bowl in  Paradise
 The  Oregon State Beavers defeated the  Florida Gators, 30–3.
 December 17, 2022: 2022 Frisco Bowl in  Frisco
 The  Boise State Broncos defeated the  North Texas Mean Green, 35–32.
 December 19, 2022: 2022 Myrtle Beach Bowl in  Conway
 The  Marshall Thundering Herd defeated the  UConn Huskies, 28–14.
 December 20, 2022: 2022 Famous Idaho Potato Bowl in  Boise
 The  Eastern Michigan Eagles defeated the  San Jose State Spartans, 41–27.
 December 20, 2022: 2022 Boca Raton Bowl in  Boca Raton
 The  Toledo Rockets defeated the  Liberty Flames, 21–19.
 December 21, 2022: 2022 New Orleans Bowl in  New Orleans
 The  Western Kentucky Hilltoppers defeated the  South Alabama Jaguars, 44–23.
 December 22, 2022: 2022 Armed Forces Bowl in  Fort Worth
 The  Air Force Falcons defeated the  Baylor Bears, 30–15.
 December 23, 2022: 2022 Independence Bowl in  Shreveport
 The  Houston Cougars defeated the  Louisiana Ragin' Cajuns, 23–16.
 December 23, 2022: 2022 Gasparilla Bowl in  Tampa
 The  Wake Forest Demon Deacons defeated the  Missouri Tigers, 27–17.
 December 24, 2022: 2022 Hawaii Bowl in  Honolulu
 The  Middle Tennessee Blue Raiders defeated the  San Diego State Aztecs, 25–23.
 December 26, 2022: 2022 Quick Lane Bowl in  Detroit
 The  New Mexico State Aggies defeated the  Bowling Green Falcons, 24–19.
 December 27, 2022: 2022 Camellia Bowl in  Montgomery
 The  Buffalo Bulls defeated the  Georgia Southern Eagles, 23–21.
 December 27, 2022: 2022 First Responder Bowl in  University Park
 The  Memphis Tigers defeated the  Utah State Aggies, 38–10.
 December 27, 2022: 2022 Birmingham Bowl in  Birmingham
 The  East Carolina Pirates defeated the  Coastal Carolina Chanticleers, 53–29.
 December 27, 2022: 2022 Guaranteed Rate Bowl in  Phoenix
 The  Wisconsin Badgers defeated the  Oklahoma State Cowboys, 24–17.
 December 28, 2022: 2022 Military Bowl in  Annapolis
 The  Duke Blue Devils defeated the  UCF Knights, 30–13.
 December 28, 2022: 2022 Liberty Bowl in  Memphis
 The  Arkansas Razorbacks defeated the  Kansas Jayhawks, 55–53.
 December 28, 2022: 2022 Holiday Bowl in  San Diego
 The  Oregon Ducks defeated the  North Carolina Tar Heels, 28–27.
 December 28, 2022: 2022 Texas Bowl in  Houston
 The  Texas Tech Red Raiders defeated the  Ole Miss Rebels, 42–25.
 December 29, 2022: 2022 Pinstripe Bowl in  New York City
 The  Minnesota Golden Gophers defeated the  Syracuse Orange, 28–20.
 December 29, 2022: 2022 Cheez-It Bowl in  Orlando
 The  Florida State Seminoles defeated the  Oklahoma Sooners, 35–32.
 December 29, 2022: 2022 Alamo Bowl in  San Antonio
 The  Washington Huskies defeated the  Texas Longhorns, 27–20.
 December 30, 2022: 2022 Duke's Mayo Bowl in  Charlotte
 The  Maryland Terrapins defeated the  NC State Wolfpack, 16–12.
 December 30, 2022: 2022 Sun Bowl in  El Paso
 The  Pittsburgh Panthers defeated the  UCLA Bruins, 37–35.
 December 30, 2022: 2022 Gator Bowl in  Jacksonville
 The  Notre Dame Fighting Irish defeated the  South Carolina Gamecocks, 45–38.
 December 30, 2022: 2022 Arizona Bowl in  Tucson
 The  Ohio Bobcats defeated the  Wyoming Cowboys, 30–27.
 December 31, 2022: 2022 Music City Bowl in  Nashville
 The  Iowa Hawkeyes defeated the  Kentucky Wildcats, 21–0.
 January 2: 2023 ReliaQuest Bowl in  Tampa
 The  Mississippi State Bulldogs defeated the  Illinois Fighting Illini, 19–10.
 January 2: 2023 Citrus Bowl in  Orlando
 The  LSU Tigers defeated the  Purdue Boilermakers, 63–7.

Indoor American football
 March 17 – August 5: 2023 IFL season
 March 10 – June 23: 2023 CIF season
 April 8 – August 12: 2023 NAL season

European League of Football
 June – September 24: 2023 ELF season
 September 24: Championship Game in  Duisburg

X-League
 January 3: 76th Rice Bowl in  Tokyo
 Fujitsu Frontiers defeat the Panasonic Impulse, 29–21

Aquatics

FINA
 July 14–30: 2023 World Aquatics Championships in  Fukuoka
 August 2–11: 2023 FINA World Masters Championships in  Fukuoka
 August 30 – September 3: 2023 FINA Youth Artistic Swimming Championships in  Athens

Archery

Archery World Championships
 July 3–9: 2023 World Archery Youth Championships in  Limerick
 July 17–23: 2023 World Para Archery Championships in  Plzeň
 July 31 – August 6: 2023 World Archery Championships in  Berlin

2023 Archery World Cup
 April 18–23: AWC #1 in  Antalya
 May 16–21: AWC #2 in  Shanghai
 June 13–18: AWC #3 in  Medellín
 August 15–20: AWC #4 in  Paris
 September 9 & 10: AWC #5 (final) in  Hermosillo

2022–23 Indoor Archery World Series
 November 18–20, 2022: GT Open in  Strassen
 Compound winners:  Nicolas Girard (m) /  Ella Gibson (f)
 Recurve winners:  Florent Mulot (m) /  Gabriela Schloesser (f)
 December 10 & 11, 2022: Taipei Archery Open in  Taipei
 Compound winners:  Mike Schloesser (m) /  Muskan Kirar (f)
 Recurve winners:  Wei Chun-heng (m) /  Gabriela Schloesser (f)
 Compound U21 winners:  WANG Cheng-ling (m) /  KUO Yen-yu (f)
 Recurve U21 winners:  WU Yu-ming (m) /  LIN Shu-yan (f)
 January 20–22: Sud de France Archery Tournament in  Nîmes
 Barebow winners:  Xavier Roussel (m) /  Ana María Cano García (f)
 Compound winners:  Kris Schaff (m) /  Lisell Jäätma (f)
 Recurve winners:  Thomas Chirault (m) /  Tatiana Andreoli (f)
 February 3–5: The Vegas Shoot in  Las Vegas
 February 4: Indoor Archery World Series Finals in  Las Vegas

Association football

FIFA World Cups
 February 1–11: 2022 FIFA Club World Cup in 
 May 20 – June 11: 2023 FIFA U-20 World Cup in 
 November 10 – December 2: 2023 FIFA U-17 World Cup in

UEFA
 April 6: 2023 Women's Finalissima in  London
 April 24: 2022–23 UEFA Youth League Final in  Nyon
 May 12 – June 4: 2023 UEFA European Under-17 Championship in 
 May 14–26: 2023 UEFA Women's Under-17 Championship in 
 May 31: 2023 UEFA Europa League Final in  Budapest
 June 4: 2023 UEFA Women's Champions League Final in  Eindhoven
 June 7: 2023 UEFA Europa Conference League Final in  Prague
 June 10: 2023 UEFA Champions League Final in  Istanbul
 June 14–18: 2023 UEFA Nations League Finals in the 
 July 3–16: 2023 UEFA European Under-19 Championship in 
 July 18–30: 2023 UEFA Women's Under-19 Championship in 
 August 16: 2023 UEFA Super Cup in  Kazan
 TBA for June: 2023 UEFA Regions' Cup Final (location TBA)

CONMEBOL
 January 19 – February 12: 2023 South American U-20 Championship in 
 February 7 – November 11: 2023 Copa Libertadores
 February 21 & 28: 2023 Recopa Sudamericana
 March 7 – October 28: 2023 Copa Sudamericana
 March 30 – April 23: 2023 South American U-17 Championship in 
 July 1–16: 2023 U-20 Copa Libertadores in 
 October 5–21: 2023 Copa Libertadores Femenina in 
 November 17 – December 3: 2023 South American U-15 Championship in

AFC
 March 1–18: 2023 AFC U-20 Asian Cup in 
 April 29 & May 6: 2022 AFC Champions League Final (locations TBA)
 May 3–20: 2023 AFC U-17 Asian Cup in 
 June 16 – July 16: 2023 AFC Asian Cup in 
 TBA: 2023 AFC Women's Club Championship (location TBA)

CAF
 January 13 – February 4: 2022 African Nations Championship in 
 February 18 – March 12: 2023 Africa U-20 Cup of Nations in 
 April 8–30: 2023 Africa U-17 Cup of Nations in 
 August 11–13: 2023 CAF Super Cup (location TBA)
 TBA: 2023 Africa U-23 Cup of Nations in 
 TBA: 2022–23 CAF Champions League Final (location TBA)
 TBA: 2022–23 CAF Confederation Cup Final (location TBA)
 TBA: 2023 CAF Women's Champions League Final (location TBA)

CONCACAF
 February 11–26: 2023 CONCACAF U-17 Championship in 
 May 31 & June 4: 2023 CONCACAF Champions League Final (location TBA)
 June 26 – July 16: 2023 CONCACAF Gold Cup (location TBA)
 TBA: 2022–23 CONCACAF Nations League Final (location TBA)

OFC
 TBA: 2023 OFC U-19 Women's Championship (location TBA)
 TBA: 2023 OFC U-16 Women's Championship (location TBA)
 TBA: 2023 OFC Champions League Final (location TBA)

Athletics

2023 World Athletics Series
 February 18: 2023 World Athletics Cross Country Championships in  Bathurst
 May 13 & 14: 2023 World Athletics Relays in  Guangzhou
 August 19–27: 2023 World Athletics Championships in  Budapest
 September 30 & October 1: 2023 World Athletics Road Running Championships in  Riga

NACAC
 March 19: 2023 Pan American Marathon Championships in  Caracas
 March 26: 2023 NACAC Half Marathon Championships in  Varadero
 April 15 & 16: 2023 Pan American Race Walking Cup in  Managua
 May 13 & 14: 2023 Pan American Combined Events Cup in  Ottawa
 July 21–23: 2023 NACAC U18 and U23 Championships in Athletics (location TBA)
 August 4–6: 2023 Pan American U20 Athletics Championships in  Mayagüez

CONSUDATLE
 January 22: 2023 South American Cross Country Championships in  Poços de Caldas
 10 km winners:  Fábio Jesus Correia (m) /  Lucineida Moreira (f)
 Men's U20 8 km winner:  Pedro Marín
 Women's U20 6 km winner:  Gabriela de Freitas Tardivo
 Men's U18 6 km winner:  Salvador Lucero
 Women's U18 4 km winner:  Amparo Herrera
 4x2000 Mixed winners:  (Leandro Alves Prates, July Ferreira da Silva, Jessica Ladeira Soares, Jânio Marcos Varjão)
 TBA: 2023 South American Championships in Athletics (location TBA)
 TBA: 2023 South American U20 Championships in Athletics (location TBA)

European Athletic Association
 January 22: 2023 Mediterranean U23 Indoor Championships in  Valencia
 60 m winners:  William Aguessy (m) /  Polyniki Emmanouilidou (f)
 400 m winners:  Markel Fernández (m) /  Veronika Drljačić (f)
 800 m winners:  Yanis Meziane (m) /  Nina Vuković (f)
 1500 m winners:  Mohamed Attaoui (m) /  Klara Andrijašević (f)
 60 m Hurdles winners:  Christos-Panagiotis Roumtsios (m) /  Paula Blanquer (f)
 Women's Pole Vault winner:  Elina Giallurachis
 Men's High Jump winner:  Edoardo Stronati
 Women's Long Jump winner:  Larissa Iapichino
 Men's Triple Jump winner:  Thomas Martinez
 Men's Shot Put winner:  Miguel Gómez
 February 5 : European Champion Clubs Cup Cross Country in  Oropesa del Mar
 March 2–5: 2023 European Athletics Indoor Championships in  Istanbul
 May 21: 2023 European Race Walking Team Championships in  Poděbrady
 June 23–25: 2023 European Athletics Team Championships in  Chorzów
 July 13–16: 2023 European Athletics U23 Championships in  Espoo
 August 7–10: 2023 European Athletics U20 Championships in  Jerusalem
 December 10: 2023 European Cross Country Championships in  Brussels

Asian Athletics Association
 February 10–12: 2023 Asian Indoor Athletics Championships in  Nur-Sultan
 April 20–23: 2023 Asian Youth Athletics Championships in  Tashkent (TBD)
 June 4–7: 2023 Asian Junior Athletics Championships in  Yecheon County (TBD)
 July 12–16: 2023 Asian Athletics Championships in  Pattaya
 TBA: 2023 Asian Marathon Championships (location TBA)

2023 World Marathon Majors
 March 5: 2023 Tokyo Marathon in 
 April 17: 2023 Boston Marathon in the 
 April 23: 2023 London Marathon in the 
 September 24: 2023 Berlin Marathon in 
 October 8: 2023 Chicago Marathon in the  United States
 November 5: 2023 New York City Marathon (final) in the  United States

2023 Diamond League
 May 5: 2023 Doha Diamond League in 
 May 28: Meeting International Mohammed VI d'Athlétisme de Rabat in 
 June 2: Golden Gala in  Rome
 June 9: 2023 Meeting de Paris in 
 June 15: Bislett Games in  Oslo
 June 30: Athletissima in  Lausanne
 July 2: BAUHAUS-galan in  Stockholm
 July 16: Kamila Skolimowska Memorial in  Silesia
 July 21: Herculis in  Fontvieille
 July 23: Anniversary Games in  London
 July 29: Diamond League Shanghai in 
 August 3: Diamond League Shenzhen in 
 August 31: 2023 Weltklasse Zürich in 
 September 8: Memorial Van Damme in  Brussels
 September 16 & 17: Prefontaine Classic (final) in  Eugene, Oregon

2023 World Athletics Label Road Races
Gold
 January 15: Mumbai Marathon in 
 Winners:  Lemi Berhanu Hayle (m) /  Anchialem Haymanot (f)
 January 15: Houston Marathon in 
 Winners:  Dominic Ondoro (m) /  Hitomi Niiya (f)
 January 15: Houston Half Marathon in 
 Winners:  Leul Aleme (m) /  Hiwot Gebremaryam (f)
 February 4: Lagos City Marathon in 

Platinum
 January 29: Osaka International Women's Marathon in 
 Winner:  Haven Hailu Desse

Elite
 January 20: Doha Marathon in 
 Winners:  Mouhcine Outalha (m) /  Meseret Belete (f)
 January 21: Buriram Marathon in 
 Winners:  Titus Kimutai (m) /  Agnes Keino (f)
 February 5: Beppu-Ōita Marathon in  Beppu
 February 5: Kagawa Marugame Half Marathon in  Marugame

Label
 January 15: 10K Valencia Ibercaja in 
 Winners:  Weldon Langat (f) /  Yalemzerf Yehualaw (f)
 January 22: Mitja Marató Internacional Vila de Santa Pola in 
 Winners:  Benard Biwott (m) /  Beatrice Cheserek (f)
 January 29: Marrakech Marathon in 
 Winners:  Gilbert Kibet (m) /  Kaltoum Bouaasayriya (f)
 January 29: 10K Ibiza – Platja d'en Bossa	in 
 Winners:  Benson Kiplangat (m) /  Caroline Nyaga (f)

2023 World Athletics Indoor Tour
Gold
 January 27: Init Indoor Meeting in 
 Women's 60 m winner:  Dina Asher-Smith
 Men's 400 m winner:  Benjamin Lobo Vedel
 Women's 800 m winner:  Anita Horvat
 Men's 1500 m winner:  George Mills
 Women's 3000 m winner:  Lemlem Hailu
 Men's 60 m Hurdles winner:  Enrique Llopis
 Women's Triple Jump winner:  Liadagmis Povea
 Women's Shot Put winner:  Auriol Dongmo
 February 4: New Balance Indoor Grand Prix in  Boston
 February 8: Copernicus Cup in  Toruń

Silver
 January 21: American Track League – Hawkeye Pro Classic in  Iowa City
 Men's Shot Put indoor winner:  Chukwuebuka Enekwechi
 Women's High Jump indoor winner:  Vashti Cunningham
 January 23: Astana Meeting in 
 60 m winners:  Mike Rodgers (m) /  Arialis Gandulla (f)
 400 m winners:  Mikhail Litvin (m) /  Elina Mikhina (f)
 Men's 800 m winner:  Marino Bloudek
 Women's 1500 m winner:  Jarinter Mwasya
 Men's 3000 m winner:  Ali Abdilmana
 Men's 60 m Hurdles winner:  Roger Iribarne
 Women's High Jump winner:  Nadezhda Dubovitskaya
 Women's Triple Jump winner:  Darya Reznichenko
 January 27: LILAC Grand Prix in  Spokane
 800 winners:  Noah Kibet (m) /  Kaela Edwards (f)
 1500 m winners:  Amos Bartelsmeyer (m) /  Sinclaire Johnson (f)
 3000 m winners:  Cole Hocker (m) /  Ella Donaghu (f)
 January 29: ISTAF Indoor Düsseldorf in 
 60 m winners:  Jeremiah Azu (m) /  Ewa Swoboda (f)
 60 m Hurdles winners:  Jakub Szymański (m) /  Pia Skrzyszowska (f)
 Men's Pole Vault winner:  KC Lightfoot
 Women's Long Jump winner:  Malaika Mihambo
 January 31: Hvězdy v Nehvizdech in 
 High Jump winners:  Thomas Carmoy (m) /  Kristina Ovchinnikova (f)
 Shot Put winners:  Tomáš Staněk (f) /  Sarah Mitton (f)
 February 2: Czech Indoor Gala 2023 in  Ostrava
 Men's 60 m winner:  Jeremiah Azu
 Men's 200 m winner:  Reynier Mena
 400 m winners:  Isayah Boers (m) /  Lieke Klaver (f)
 Men's 800 m winner:  Abdessalem Ayouni
 Men's Mile winner:  Elzan Bibić
 Women's 1500 m winner:  Tigist Ketema
 60 m Hurdles winners:  Roger Iribarne (m) /  Alaysha Johnson (f)
 Women's Pole Vault winner:  Tina Šutej
 Men's Long Jump winner:  Lester Lescay
 Women's Triple Jump winner:  Neja Filipič
 February 4: Meeting de l'Eure in  Val-de-Reuil
 February 4: Hustopečské skákání in  Hustopeče
 February 7: Beskydská laťka in  Třinec
 February 8: Mondeville Meeting in 

Bronze
 January 21: Jablonec Indoor 2023 in 
 60 m winners:  Kayhan Özer (m) /  Dina Asher-Smith (f)
 Men's Shot Put winner:  Tomáš Staněk
 January 22: CMCM Indoor Meeting in 
 Women's 60 m winner:  Patrizia van der Weken
 Men's 400 m winner:  Alexander Doom
 800 m winners:  Tibo De Smet (m) /  Naomi Korir (f)
 Women's 1500 m winner:  Josephine Chelangat Kiplangat
 Men's 3000 m winner:  Simon Denissel
 60 m Hurdles winners:  Asier Martínez (m) /  Natalia Christofi (f)
 Women's High Jump winner:  Solène Gicquel
 Women's Triple Jump winner:  Ilionis Guillaume
 Men's Shot Put winner:  Bob Bertemes
 January 25: International Jump Meeting Cottbus in 
 Men's Pole Vault winner:  Sam Kendricks
 Women's High Jump winner:  Yaroslava Mahuchikh
 January 25: Aarhus SPRINT'n'JUMP in 
 60 m winners:  Adam Thomas (m) /  Guðbjörg Jóna Bjarnadóttir (f)
 60 m Hurdles winners:  Krzysztof Kiljan (m) /  Sarah Lavin (f)
 Long Jump winners:  Andreas Trajkovski (m) /  Molly Palmer (f)
 Women's Triple Jump winner:  Ottavia Cestonaro
 January 28: Dr. Sander Invitational in  New York City
 60 m winners:  Travis Williams (m) /  Jayla Jamison (f)
 5000 m winners:  Rogério Amaral (m) /  Caroline Webb (f)
 60 m Hurdles winners:  Terrel Williams (m) /  Yanla Ndjip-Nyemeck (f)
 Men's Pole Vault winner:  Travis Snyder
 Long Jump winners:  Camryn O'Bannon (m) /  Kayla Woods (f)
 Triple Jump winners:  Altan Mitchell (m) /  Helen Chu (f)
 Shot Put winners:  Jeff Kline (m) /  Kathleen Young (f)
 Women's Distance Medley winners:  (Danielle Adams, Elise O'Leary, Megan Perrotta, Randi Burr)
 January 28: Meeting National Indoor Lyon in 
 Men's 60 m winner:  Kayhan Özer
 800 m winners:  Abdelati El Guesse (m) /  Charlotte Pizzo (f)
 1500 m winners:  Tom Elmer (m) /  Marissa Damink (f)
 3000 m winners:  Ali Abdilmana (m) /  Tigist Ketema (f)
 60 m Hurdles winners:  Dimitri Bascou (m) /  Maayke Tjin-A-Lim (f)
 Men's Long Jump winner:  Lester Lescay
 Women's Triple Jump winner:  Dariya Derkach
 January 28: Kladno INDOOR 2023 in 
 High Jump winners:  Erik Portillo (m) /  Yuliya Chumachenko (f)
 Shot Put winners:  Tomáš Staněk (m) /  Sarah Mitton (f)
 January 28: Manchester World Indoor Tour BRONZE in 
 Men's 60 m winner:  Medwin Odamtten
 Men's 400 m winner:  Lee Thompson
 Women's 600 m winner:  Keely Hodgkinson
 800 m winners:  Simone Barontini (m) /  Isabelle Boffey (f)
 Women's 1500 m winner:  Ellie Baker
 3000 m winners:  Emil Danielsson (m) /  Jennifer Nesbitt
 Women's 60 m Hurdles winner:  Natalia Christofi
 Men's Long Jump winner:  Gabriel Bitan
 Women's Triple Jump winner:  Caroline Joyeux
 Shot Put winners:  Scott Lincoln (m) /  Yemisi Magdalena Ogunleye (f)
 January 28: Meeting indoor Nantes Métropole in 
 60 m winners:  Eugene Amo-Dadzie (m) /  Melissa Gutschmidt (f)
 400 m winners:  João Coelho (m) /  Camille Seri (f)
 800 m winners:  Filip Ostrowski (m) /  Naomi Korir (f)
 60 m Hurdles winners:  Elmo Lakka (m) /  Cyréna Samba-Mayela (f)
 Men's Pole Vault winner:  Valentin Pottier
 Women's High Jump winner:  Iryna Herashchenko
 Long Jump winners:  Jean-Pierre Bertrand (m) /  Tiphaine Mauchant (f)
 January 29: Folksam GP Stockholm Indoor 2023 in 
 60 m winners:  Henrik Larsson (m) /  Salomé Kora (f)
 400 m winners:  Gustav Lundholm Nielsen (m) /  Gunta Vaičule (f)
 800 m winners:  Andreas Kramer (m) /  Vivian Chebet Kiprotich (f)
 Men's 1500 m winner:  Azeddine Habz
 Women's 60 m Hurdles winner:  Annimari Korte
 Men's High Jump winner:  Andriy Protsenko
 Long Jump winners:  Thobias Montler (m) /  Tilde Johansson (f)
 Women's Shot Put winner:  Danniel Thomas-Dodd
 February 3: Elite Indoor Track Miramas Meeting in 
 Men's 60 m winner:  Arthur Cissé
 Men's 400 m winner:  Muhammad Abdallah Kounta
 Men's 800 m winner:  Mohamed Belbachir
 Women's 1500 m winner:  Ludovica Cavalli
 Men's 3000 m winner:  Ali Abdilmana
 60 m Hurdles winners:  Ilari Manninen (m) /  Dafni Georgiou (f)
 Men's High Jump winner:  Hichem Bouhanoun
 Women's Triple Jump winner:  Tuğba Danışmaz
 Men's Pole Vault winner:  Yao Jie
 February 3: BKK Freundenberg High Jump Meeting in  Weinheim
 Winners:  Jonas Wagner (m) /  Christina Honsel (f)
 February 4: ORLEN Cup Łódź 2023 in 
 60 m winners:  Marcell Jacobs (m) /  Ewa Swoboda (f)
 60 m Hurdles winners:  Roger Iribarne (m) /  Pia Skrzyszowska (f)
 Men's High Jump winner:  Norbert Kobielski
 Men's Pole Vault winner:  Ernest John Obiena
 Men's Shot Put winner:  Tomáš Staněk
 February 4: IFAM Gent Indoor in 

Challenger
 January 25: Meeting Internacional Ciudad de Valencia in 
 60 m winners:  Sergio López (m) /  Rosalina Santos (f)
 400 m winners:  Lorenzo Benati (m) /  Laura Hernández (f)
 800 m winners:  Cristian Gabriel Voicu (m) /  Lorea Ibarzabal (f)
 1500 m winners:  Raphael Pallitsch (m) /  Florencia Borelli (f)
 3000 m winners:  Federico Bruno (m) /  Águeda Marqués (f)
 60 m Hurdles:  Enrique Llopis (m) /  Paula Blanquer (f)
 Men's Pole Vault winner:  Aleix Pi
 Women's High Jump winner:  Anabela Neto
 Long Jump winners:  Maximilian Entholzner (m) /  Fátima Diame (f)
 Triple Jump winners:  Hugues Fabrice Zango (m) /  Osasere Eghosa (f)
 Shot Put winners:  José Ángel Pinedo (m) /  Judit Prats (f)
 January 28: Nordhausen Indoor Shot Put in 
 Shot Put winners:  Bob Bertemes (m) /  Sara Gambetta (f)
 January 28: PERCHE EN OR in  Roubaix
 Winner:  Ernest John Obiena
 January 28: Meeting Internacional Catalunya Pista Coberta in  Sabadell
 60 m winners:  Samuele Ceccarelli (m) /  Jaël Bestué (f)
 400 m winners:  Iñaki Cañal (m) /  Tereza Petržilková (f)
 800 m winners:  Mariano García (m) /  Lorea Ibarzabal (f)
 Women's 1500 m winner:  Águeda Marqués
 60 m Hurdles winners:  Roger Iribarne (m) /  Xènia Benach (f)
 Women's High Jump winner:  Kateryna Tabashnyk
 Women's Long Jump winner:  Larissa Iapichino
 Men's Pole Vault winner:  Claudio Stecchi
 Men's Shot Put winner:  Roman Kokoshko
 January 29: Elán Míting in  Bratislava
 60 m winners:  Ján Volko (m) /  Monika Weigertová (f)
 400 m winners:  Miroslav Marček (m) /  Simona Malatincová (f)
 800 m winners:  Tomáš Vystrk (m) /  Cristina Daniela Bălan (f)
 3000 m winners:  Peter Kováč (m) /  Žofia Naňová (f)
 60 m Hurdles winners:  Valdó Szűcs (m) /  Viktória Forster (f)
 Long Jump winners:  Adam Hriň (m) /  Monika Lehenová (f)
 February 2: Karsten Warholm Invitation AL in  Ulsteinvik
 Women's 60 m winner:  Elaine Thompson-Herah
 200 m winners:  Oskari Lehtonen (m) /  Imke Vervaet (f)
 400 m winners:  Karsten Warholm (m) /  Henriette Jæger (f)
 800 m winners:  Nicholas Kiplangat Kebenei (m) /  Danaid Prinsen (f)
 1500 m winners:  Cornelius Tuwei (m) /  Amalie Sæten (f)
 Women's High Jump winner:  Yaroslava Mahuchikh
 Long Jump winners:  Abraham Seaneke (m) /  Thale Leirfall (f)
 Men's Shot Put winner:  Bob Bertemes
 February 2: Duplantis Classic in  Uppsala
 Men's Pole Vault winner:  Armand Duplantis
 February 2: Gothenburg Indoor in 
 60 m winners:  Su Bingtian (m) /  Julia Henriksson (f)
 Women's 200 m winner:  Julia Henriksson
 Men's 400 m winner:  Carl Bengtström
 800 m winners:  Andreas Kramer (m) /  Gabriela Gajanová (f)
 Women's 3000 m winner:  Kristine Eikrem Engeset
 Women's High Jump winner:  Matilda Nilsson
 Long Jump winners:  Miltiadis Tentoglou (m) /  Khaddi Sagnia (f)
 Triple Jump winners:  Andreas Pantazis (m) /  Aina Grikšaitė (f)
 February 3: Filathlitikos Kallithea International High Jump Indoor Meeting in 
 High Jump winners:  Antonios Merlos (m) /  Angelina Topić (f)
 February 3: 10. Breuninger Hallenmeeting in  Erfurt
 60 m winners:  Julian Wagner (m) /  Malaika Mihambo (f)
 200 m winners:  Benedikt Wallstein (m) /  Natálie Kožuškaničová (f)
 400 m winners:  Marvin Schlegel (m) /  Alica Schmidt (f)
 800 m winners:  Guy Learmonth (m) /  Majtie Kolberg (f)
 1500 m winners:  Sven Wagner (m) /  Cari Hughes (f)
 Women's 60 m Hurdles winner: Marlene Meier
 Women's Pole Vault winner:  Agnieszka Kaszuba
 Men's Long Jump winner:  Valentin Brenner
 Women's Triple Jump winner:  Dariya Derkach
 February 5: 17th Rochlitz Shot Put Meeting in 
 February 5: Reykjavik International Games in

2023 World Athletics Combined Events Tour
Silver
 January 28 & 29: Meeting X-Athletics Combined Events in  Aubiére
 Heptathlon winner:  Simon Ehammer
 Pentathlon winner:  Léonie Cambours
 February 4 & 5: Indoor Combined Events Tallinn 2023 in

2023 World Athletics Continental Tour
Challenger
 January 21: Potts Classic	in  Hastings
 100 m winners:  Tiaan Whelpton (m) /  Georgia Hulls (f)
 400 m winners:  Tommy Te Puni (m) /  Rosie Elliott (f)
 800 m winners:  James Preston (m) /  Holly Manning (f)
 Long Jump winners:  Shay Veitch (m) /  Hannah Sandilands (f)
 Pole Vault winners:  James Steyn (m) /  Eliza McCartney (f)
 Discus Throw winners:  Connor Bell (m) /  Jade Lally (f)
 Hammer Throw winners:  Anthony Nobilo (m) /  Lauren Bruce (f)
 Shot Put winners:  Nick Palmer (m) /  Maddi Wesche (f)
 January 28: Cooks Classic in  Wanganui
 200 m winners:  Tommy Te Puni (m) /  Portia Bing (f)
 400 m winners:  Fergus Mcleay (m) /  Rosie Elliott (f)
 400 m Hurdles winners:  Jonathan Maples (m) /  Grace Wisnewski (f)
 Women's Hammer Throw winner:  Lauren Bruce
 Men's Javelin Throw winner:  Felise Vaha'i Sosaia
 High Jump winners:  Hamish Kerr (m) /  Imogen Skelton (f)
 Long Jump winners:  Lewis Arthur (m) /  Hannah Sandilands (f)
 Men's Shot Put winner:  Tom Walsh
 February 3: Capital Classic in  Wellington
 100 m winners:  Hamish Gill (m) /  Georgia Hulls (f)
 200 m winners:  Hamish Gill (m) /  Georgia Hulls (f)
 800 m winners:  James Ford (m) /  Holly Manning (f)
 110 m Hurdles winner:  Joshua Hawkins
 Women's 100 m Hurdles winner:  Anna Percy
 High Jump winners:  Rafe Coiuillault (m) /  Alice Taylor (f)
 Triple Jump winners:  Ayo Ore (m) /  Anna Thomson (f)
 Javelin Throw winners:  Douw Botes (m) /  Tori Peeters (f)
 Hammer Throw winners:  Anthony Nobilo (m) /  Lauren Bruce (f)
 Shot Put winners:  Tom Walsh (m) /  Natalia Rankin-Chitar (f)
 February 4: Sola Power Throwers Meeting in  Wellington
 Discus Throw winners:  Jade Zaia (m) /  Natalia Rankin-Chitar (f)
 Shot Put winners:  Nick Palmer (m) /  Natalia Rankin-Chitar (f)

2022–23 World Athletics Race Walking Tour
Silver
 January 6: Supernova#1 in 
 10,000m Race Walk winners:  Declan Tingay (m) /  Jemima Montag (f)
 February 2: Supernova#2 in 
 10,000m Race Walk winners:  Declan Tingay (m) /  Jemima Montag (f)

Bronze
 October 22, 2022: Lusatian International Race-Walking Meeting in  Zittau
 5 km Race Walk winners:  Jakub Bátovský (m) /  Tamara Indrišková (f)
 Women's 10 km Race Walk winner:  Sigute Brönnecke
 20 km Race Walk winners:  Carl Dohmann (m) /  Martina Netolická (f)
 35 km Race Walk winners:  Kévin Campion (m) /  Bianca Schenker (f)
 December 18, 2022: Irish Open 20 km & 35 km Race Walking Ch. in  Dublin
 20 km Race Walk winners:  Aku Partanen (m) /  Saskia Feige (f)
 35 km Race Walk winners:  Aurélien Quinion (m) /  Mayara Vicentainer (f)
 January 1: 71st New Year Race Walk in  Tokyo
 Men's 20 km Race Walk winner:  Yutaro Murayama
 Women's 10 km Race Walk winner:  Miyu Naito
 January 15: USATF National 35 km Race Walk Ch. in  Santee
 Winners:  Nick Christie (m) /  Miranda Melville (f)

2022–23 World Athletics Cross Country Tour
Gold
 October 15, 2022: Cardiff Cross Challenge in 
 Winners:  Edward Zakayo (m) /  Pamela Kosgei (f)
 October 23, 2022: Cross Country Bydgoszcz na Start in 
 Winners:  Levy Kibet (m) /  Lucy Mawia (f)
 October 23, 2022: Cross Zornotza in  Amorebieta-Etxano
 Winners:  Rodrigue Kwizera (m) /  Isabel Barreiro (f)
 November 6, 2022: Cross Internacional de Soria in 
 Winners:  Thierry Ndikumwenayo (m) /  Lucy Mawia (f)
 November 12–13, 2022: Cross de Atapuerca in 
 Winners:  Thierry Ndikumwenayo (m) /  Beatrice Chebet (f)
 November 20, 2022: Cross Internacional de Itálica in  Sevilla
 Winners:  Thierry Ndikumwenayo (m) /  Yasemin Can (f)
 November 27, 2022: Cross Internacional de la Constitución in  Alcobendas
 Winners:  Rodrigue Kwizera (m) /  Lucy Mawia (f)
 December 1, 2022: Cross Champs in  Austin
 Winners:  Edwin Kurgat (m) /  Alicia Monson (f)
 December 18, 2022: Cross Internacional de Venta de Baños in 
 Winners:  Rodrigue Kwizera (m) /  Francine Niyonsaba (f)
 January 6: 66° Campaccio in  San Giorgio su Legnano
 Winners:  Rodrigue Kwizera (m) /  Rahel Daniel (f)
 January 8: Juan Muguerza Cross-Country Race in  Elgoibar
 Winners:  Selemon Barega (m) /  Rahel Daniel (f)
 January 15: Cinque Mulini in  San Vittore Olona
 Winners:  Gideon Rono (m) /  Beatrice Chebet (f)
 January 22: Lotto Cross Cup de Hannut in 
 Winners:  Yann Schrub (m) /  Rahel Daniel (f)
 January 28: Botswana Cross-Country Challenge in  Gaborone
 February 5: Gran Premio Cáceres Campo a Través in  Calzadilla

Silver
 September 24, 2022: Lidingöloppet in  Lidingö
 Winners:  Samuel Tsegay (m) /  Sylvia Mboga Medugu (f)
 October 22, 2022: Northern Ireland International Cross Country in  Belfast
 Winners:  Abeje Ayana (m) /  Medina Eisa (f)
 October 30, 2022: Cross Cup van Mol in 
 Winners:  Joel Ayeko (m) /  Sarah Lahti (f)
 November 6, 2022: 65th Cross de San Sebastián in 
 Winners:  Addisu Yihune (m) /  Purity Chepkirui (f)
 November 27, 2022: International Warandecross Tilburg in 
 Winners:  Elzan Bibić (m) /  Sarah Lahti (f)

Bronze
 January 21: National Cross Country Nairobi in 
 Winners:  Albert Kipkorir (m) /  Esther Muthoni (f)

Badminton

International badminton championships
 February 10–19: 2023 Oceania Badminton Championships in  North Shore
 February 13–19: 2023 African Badminton Championships in  Johannesburg
 February 14–18: 2023 European Mixed Team Badminton Championships in  Aire-sur-la-Lys
 April 25–30: 2023 Badminton Asia Championships in  Dubai
 May 14–21: 2023 Sudirman Cup in  Suzhou
 August 21–27: 2023 BWF World Championships in  Copenhagen
 September 11–17: 2023 BWF World Senior Championships in  Jeonju
 October 2–15: 2023 BWF World Junior Championships (location TBA)
 December 13–17: 2023 BWF World Tour Finals (location TBA)

BWF World Tour Super 1000
 January 10–15: 2023 Malaysia Open in  Kuala Lumpur
 Singles winners:  Viktor Axelsen (m) /  Akane Yamaguchi (f)
 Men's Doubles winners:  (Fajar Alfian & Muhammad Rian Ardianto)
 Women's Doubles winners:  (Chen Qingchen & Jia Yifan)
 Mixed Doubles winners:  (Zheng Siwei & Huang Yaqiong)
 March 14–19: 2023 All England Open in  Birmingham
 June 13–18: 2023 Indonesia Open in  Jakarta
 September 5–10: 2023 China Open in  Changzhou

BWF World Tour Super 750
 January 17–22: 2023 India Open in  New Delhi
 Singles winners:  Kunlavut Vitidsarn (m) /  An Se-young (f)
 Men's Doubles winners:  (Liang Weikeng & Wang Chang)
 Women's Doubles winners:  (Nami Matsuyama & Chiharu Shida)
 Mixed Doubles winners:  (Yuta Watanabe & Arisa Higashino)
 June 6–11: 2023 Singapore Open in  Singapore Indoor Stadium
 July 25–30: 2023 Japan Open in  Tokyo
 October 17–22: 2023 Denmark Open in  Odense
 October 24–29: 2023 French Open in  Paris
 November 21–26: 2023 China Masters in  Shenzhen

BWF World Tour Super 500
 January 24–29: 2023 Indonesia Masters in  Jakarta
 Singles winners:  Jonatan Christie (m) /  An Se-young (f)
 Men's Doubles winners:  (Leo Rolly Carnando & Daniel Marthin)
 Women's Doubles winners:  (Liu Shengshu & Zhang Shuxian)
 Mixed Doubles winners:  (Feng Yanzhe & Huang Dongping)
 May 23–28: 2023 Malaysia Masters in  Kuala Lumpur
 May 30 – June 4: 2023 Thailand Open in  Bangkok
 July 4–9: 2023 Canada Open in  Calgary
 July 18–23: 2023 Korea Open in  Seoul
 August 1–6: 2023 Australian Open in  Sydney
 September 12–17: 2023 Hong Kong Open in  Kowloon
 October 10–15: 2023 Finnish Open in  Vantaa
 November 14–19: 2023 Japan Masters in  Kumamoto

BWF World Tour Super 300
 January 31 – February 5: 2023 Thailand Masters in  Bangkok
 March 7–12: 2023 German Open in  Mülheim
 March 21–26: 2023 Swiss Open in  Basel
 March 28 – April 2: 2023 Spain Masters in  Madrid
 April 4–9: 2023 Orléans Masters in  Orléans
 June 20–25: 2023 Taipei Open in  Taipei
 July 11–16: 2023 U.S. Open in  Frisco
 August 8–13: 2023 New Zealand Open in  Auckland
 October 31 – November 5: 2023 Hylo Open in  Saarbrücken
 November 7–12: 2023 Korea Masters in  Gwangju
 November 28 – December 3: 2023 Syed Modi International in  Lucknow

Bandy

 March 28 – April 2: 2023 Bandy World Championship in  Åby, Växjö
 TBA: 2023 Women's Bandy World Championship in  Åby, Växjö

Baseball & Softball

WBSC
 April 15–23: 2023 U-23 Men's Softball World Cup in  Paraná (debut event)
 July 28 – August 6: 2023 U-12 Baseball World Cup in  Tainan
 October 19–30: 2023 U-15 Women's Softball World Cup in  Tokyo (debut event)
 TBA: 2023 U-18 Baseball World Cup (location TBA)
 TBA: 2023 U-18 Men's Softball World Cup (location TBA)

Major League Baseball
 March 30 – October 1: 2023 Major League Baseball season
 July 11: 2023 Major League Baseball All-Star Game at T-Mobile Park in  Seattle
 TBD: 2023 Major League Baseball draft in  Seattle
 TBD: 2023 World Series

2023 Little League World Series
 July 29 – August 5: 2023 Senior League World Series at J.B. Red Owens Sports Complex in  Easley
 July 30 – August 5: 2023 Junior League Softball World Series at Everest Park in  Kirkland
 July 30 – August 6: 2023 Intermediate League World Series at Max Baer Park in  Livermore
 July 31 – August 6: 2023 Senior League Softball World Series at Lower Sussex Little League Complex in  Roxana
 August 9–15: 2023 Little League Softball World Series at Stallings Stadium in  Greenville
 August 13–20: 2023 Junior League World Series at Heritage Park in  Taylor
 August 16–27: 2023 Little League World Series at both Little League Volunteer Stadium and Howard J. Lamade Stadium in  South Williamsport

Basketball

FIBA World & Intercontinental Cups
 June 24 – July 2: 2023 FIBA Under-19 Basketball World Cup in  Debrecen
 July 15–23: 2023 FIBA Under-19 Women's Basketball World Cup in  Madrid
 August 25 – September 10: 2023 FIBA Basketball World Cup in the  Manila,  Okinawa, and  Jakarta
 TBA: 2023 FIBA Intercontinental Cup (location TBA)

FIBA Africa
 TBA: 2023 Women's Afrobasket (location TBA)
 TBA: 2023 FIBA Under-16 African Championship (location TBA)
 TBA: 2023 FIBA U16 Women's African Championship (location TBA)
 TBA: 2023 BAL season
 TBA: 2023 FIBA Africa Women's Champions Cup (location TBA)

FIBA Americas
 TBA: 2023 FIBA Women's AmeriCup (location TBA)
 TBA: 2023 FIBA Under-16 Americas Championship (location TBA)
 TBA: 2023 FIBA Under-16 Women's Americas Championship (location TBA)
 TBA: 2022–23 BCL Americas
 TBA: 2023 Liga Sudamericana de Básquetbol

FIBA Asia
 TBA: 2023 FIBA Women's Asia Cup (location TBA)
 TBA: 2023 FIBA Under-16 Asian Championship (location TBA)
 TBA: 2023 FIBA U16 Women's Asian Championship (location TBA)

Clubs competitions
 January 2 – March 15: 2023 ABL season
 December 19, 2022 – May 2023: 2022–23 West Asia Super League

FIBA Europe
 June 15–25: EuroBasket Women 2023 in  Tel Aviv and  Ljubljana
 TBA: 2023 FIBA European Championship for Small Countries (location TBA)
 TBA: 2023 FIBA Women's European Championship for Small Countries (location TBA)
 TBA: 2023 FIBA U20 European Championship (location TBA)
 TBA: 2023 FIBA U18 European Championship (location TBA)
 TBA: 2023 FIBA U16 European Championship (location TBA)
 TBA: 2023 FIBA U20 Women's European Championship (location TBA)
 TBA: 2023 FIBA U18 Women's European Championship (location TBA)
 TBA: 2023 FIBA U16 Women's European Championship (location TBA)

Clubs competitions
 October 6, 2022 –: 2022–23 EuroLeague
 September 21, 2022 – May 14: 2022–23 Basketball Champions League
 October 11, 2022 – May: 2022–23 EuroCup Basketball
 September 27, 2022 – April 26: 2022–23 FIBA Europe Cup
 September 21, 2022 –: 2022–23 EuroLeague Women
 October 5, 2022 –: 2022–23 EuroCup Women
 October 28, 2022 –: 2022–23 European Women's Basketball League
 September 30, 2022 –: 2022–23 ABA League First Division
 October 2022 –: 2022–23 ABA League Second Division
 September 30, 2022 –: 2022–23 BNXT League
 September 30, 2022 –: 2022–23 Latvian–Estonian Basketball League
 November 22, 2022 –: 2022–23 European North Basketball League
 October 27, 2022 –: 2022–23 BIBL season
 October 8, 2022 –: 2022–23 Baltic Women's Basketball League

National Basketball Association
 October 18, 2022 – April 9, 2023: 2022–23 NBA season
 February 19: 2023 NBA All-Star Game at the Vivint Arena in  Salt Lake City
 April 15: 2023 NBA playoffs
 June 22: 2023 NBA draft

National Collegiate Athletic Association
March 14 – April 2: 2023 NCAA Division I men's basketball tournament
March 17 – April 3: 2023 NCAA Division I women's basketball tournament

Beach soccer

FIFA
 TBA: 2023 FIFA Beach Soccer World Cup (location TBA)

UEFA
 TBA: 2023 FIFA Beach Soccer World Cup qualification (UEFA) (location TBA)
 TBA: 2023 Euro Beach Soccer League (location TBA)
 TBA: 2023 Euro Winners Cup (location TBA)
 TBA: 2023 Women's Euro Winners Cup (location TBA)

CONMEBOL
 March 11–19: 2023 Copa América de Beach Soccer in 
 May 7–14: 2022 Copa Libertadores de Beach Soccer in 
 August 5–13: South American Under-20 Beach Soccer Championship in 
 December 3–10: 2023 Copa Libertadores de Beach Soccer in 
 TBA: 2023 FIFA Beach Soccer World Cup qualification (CONMEBOL) (location TBA)

AFC
 TBA: 2023 AFC Beach Soccer Asian Cup (location TBA)

CONCACAF
 February 6–12: 2023 Americas Winners Cup in 
 TBA: 2023 CONCACAF Beach Soccer Championship (location TBA)

OFC
 TBA: 2023 OFC Beach Soccer Nations Cup (location TBA)

Beach Soccer Worldwide
 TBA: 2023 Beach Soccer Intercontinental Cup in  Dubai
 TBA: 2023 BSWW Mundialito (location TBA)

Beach volleyball

BV World Championships
 October 6–15: 2023 Beach Volleyball World Championships in  Tlaxcala

BV Continental Championships

European Volleyball Confederation (BV)
 July 26–29: 2023 European U22 Beach Volleyball Championships in  Timișoara
 August 10–13: 2023 European U20 Beach Volleyball Championships in  Riga
 August 24–27: 2023 European U18 Beach Volleyball Championships in  Madrid

Asian Volleyball Confederation (BV)

2023 Volleyball World Beach Pro Tour
 January 26–29: 2022 Volleyball World Beach Pro Tour Finals in  Doha
 Men's winners:  (Anders Mol & Christian Sørum)
 Women's winners:  (Sara Hughes & Kelly Claes)
 December 7–10: 2023 Volleyball World Beach Pro Tour Finals in  Doha

Elite 16
 February 1–5: BV Elite 16 #1 in  Doha
 March 22–26: BV Elite 16 #2 in  Tepic
 April 26–30: BV Elite #3 in  Uberlândia
 May 31 – June 4: BV Elite #4 in  Ostrava
 July 5–9: BV Elite 16 #5 in  Gstaad
 July 26–30: BV Elite 16 #6 in  Montreal
 August 16–20: BV Elite 16 #7 in  Hamburg
 September 27 – October 1: BV Elite 16 #8 in  Paris
 November 1–5: BV Elite 16 #9 in  Cape Town
 November 8–12: BV Elite 16 #10 in  Dubai

Challenge
 March 16–19: BV Challenge #1 in  La Paz
 April 6–9: BV Challenge #2 in  Itapema
 April 13–16: BV Challenge #3 in  Saquarema
 June 15–18: BV Challenge #4 in  Jūrmala
 July 20–23: BV Challenge #6 in  Edmonton
 November 2–5: BV Challenge #8 in  Hainan

2023 South American Beach Volleyball Circuit 
 January 20–22: 1st Round in  Rancagua
 Men's winners:  Marco Grimalt & Esteban Grimalt
 Women's winners:  Tainá Silva Bigi & Victória Tosta

Biathlon

IBU World & Continental Championships
 January 25–29: 2023 IBU Open European Championships in  Lenzerheide
 Individual winners:  Endre Strømsheim (m) /  Lisa Maria Spark (f)
 Pursuit winners:  Vebjørn Sørum (m) /  Selina Grotian (f)
 Sprint winners:  Erlend Bjøntegaard (m) /  Anastasiya Merkushyna (f)
 Single Mixed Relay winners:  (Juni Arnekleiv & Endre Strømsheim)
 Mixed Relay winners:  (Maren Kirkeeide, Karoline Erdal, Erlend Bjøntegaard, & Vebjørn Sørum)
 February 8–19: Biathlon World Championships 2023 in  Oberhof
 March 4–12: Biathlon Junior World Championships 2023 in  Shchuchinsk

Biathlon World Cup
 November 29 – December 4, 2022: World Cup #1 in  Kontiolahti
 Individual winners:  Martin Ponsiluoma (m) /  Hanna Öberg (f)
 Pursuit winners:  Johannes Thingnes Bø (m) /  Julia Simon (f)
 Sprint winners:  Johannes Thingnes Bø (m) /  Lisa Theresa Hauser (f)
 Men's 4x7.5 km Relay winners:  (Vetle Sjåstad Christiansen, Sturla Holm Lægreid, Tarjei Bø, & Johannes Thingnes Bø)
 Women's 4x6 km Relay winners:  (Linn Persson, Anna Magnusson, Hanna Öberg, & Elvira Öberg)
 December 8–11, 2022: World Cup #2 in  Hochfilzen
 Pursuit winners:  Johannes Thingnes Bø (m) /  Julia Simon (f)
 Sprint winners:  Johannes Thingnes Bø (m) /  Denise Herrmann-Wick (f)
 Men's 4x7.5 km Relay winners:  (Sturla Holm Lægreid, Filip Fjeld Andersen, Johannes Thingnes Bø, & Vetle Sjåstad Christiansen)
 Women's 4x6 km Relay winners:  (Lou Jeanmonnot, Anaïs Chevalier-Bouchet, Chloé Chevalier, & Julia Simon)
 December 15–18, 2022: World Cup #3 in  Annecy
 Pursuit winners:  Sturla Holm Lægreid (m) /  Elvira Öberg (f)
 Sprint winners:  Johannes Thingnes Bø (m) /  Anna Magnusson (f)
 Mass Start winners:  Johannes Dale (m) /  Lisa Theresa Hauser (f)
 January 5–8: World Cup #4 in  Pokljuka
 Men's Pursuit & Sprint winner:  Johannes Thingnes Bø
 Women's Pursuit & Sprint winner:  Elvira Öberg
 Single Mixed Relay winners:  (Vetle Sjåstad Christiansen & Ingrid Landmark Tandrevold
 Mixed Relay winners:  (Fabien Claude, Quentin Fillon Maillet, Anaïs Chevalier-Bouchet, & Julia Simon)
 January 11–15: World Cup #5 in  Ruhpolding
 Individual winners:  Johannes Thingnes Bø (m) /  Lisa Vittozzi (f)
 Mass Start winners:  Johannes Thingnes Bø (m) /  Julia Simon (f)
 Men's 4x7.5 km Relay winners:  (Sturla Holm Lægreid, Tarjei Bø, Vetle Sjåstad Christiansen, & Johannes Thingnes Bø)
 Women's 4x6 km Relay winners:  (Karoline Offigstad Knotten, Ragnhild Femsteinevik, Marte Olsbu Røiseland, & Ingrid Landmark Tandrevold)
 January 19–22: World Cup #6 in  Antholz-Anterselva
 Pursuit winners:  Johannes Thingnes Bø (m) /  Denise Herrmann-Wick (f)
 Sprint winners:  Johannes Thingnes Bø (m) /  Dorothea Wierer (f)
 Men's 4x7.5 km Relay winners:  (Sturla Holm Lægreid, Tarjei Bø, Johannes Thingnes Bø, & Vetle Sjåstad Christiansen)
 Women's 4x6 km Relay winners:  (Lou Jeanmonnot, Anaïs Chevalier-Bouchet, Chloé Chevalier, & Julia Simon)
 March 2–5: World Cup #7 in  Nové Město na Moravě
 March 9–12: World Cup #8 in  Östersund
 March 16–19: World Cup #9 (final) in  Oslo Holmenkollen

IBU Cup
 November 24–27, 2022: IBU Cup #1 in  Sjusjøen
 All events here were cancelled.
 November 30–December 3, 2022: IBU Cup #2 in  Idre
 Individual winners:  Endre Strömsheim (m) /  Janina Hettich-Walz (f)
 Pursuit winners:  Martin Uldal (m) /  Marthe Krakstad Johansen (f)
 Men's Sprint winner:  Endre Strömsheim (2 times) 
 Women's Sprint winners:  Marthe Krakstad Johansen (#1) /  Selina Grotian (#2)
 December 15–18, 2022: IBU Cup #3 in  Ridnaun-Val Ridanna
 Pursuit winners:  Mats Överby (m) /  Maren Kirkeeide (f)
 Sprint winners:  Endre Strömsheim (m) /  Federica Sanfilippo (f)
 Mass Start 60 winners:  Martin Uldal (m) /  Gilonne Guigonnat (f)
 January 5–8: IBU Cup #4 in  Brezno-Osrblie
 Sprint winners:  Eric Perrot (m) /  Eleonora Fauner (f)
 Super Sprint Final winners:  Eric Perrot (m) /  Maren Kirkeeide (f)
 Single Mixed Relay winners:  (Mats Ŏverby & Frida Dokken)
 Mixed Relay winners:  (Isak Frey, Endre Strömsheim, Juni Arnekleiv, & Maren Kirkeeide)
 January 13–15: IBU Cup #5 in  Arber
 Individual Short winners:  Sindre Fjellheim Jorde (m) /  Hannah Auchentaller (f)
 Men's Sprint winners:  Sindre Fjellheim Jorde (#1) /  Vebjørn Sørum (#2)
 Women's Sprint winners:  Hanna Kebinger (#1) /  Paula Botet (#2)
 February 2–4: IBU Cup #6 in  Obertilliach
 February 23–26: IBU Cup #7 in  Canmore #1
 March 1–4: IBU Cup #8 (final) in  Canmore #2

Bobsleigh & Skeleton

B & S World & Continental Championships
 December 9 & 10, 2022: 2022 IBSF World Push Championships in  Lake Placid
 Two-man bobsleigh winners:  (Kristopher Horn & Adrian Adams)
 Four-man bobsleigh winners:  (Kristopher Horn, Adrian Adams, Manteo Mitchell, & Martin Christofferson)
 Two-woman bobsleigh winners:  (Lisa Buckwitz & Neele Schuten)
 Women's Monobob winner:  Lisa Buckwitz
 Skeleton winners:  YIN Zheng (m) /  Mystique Ro (f)
 January 13–15: IBSF Junior World Championships 2023 in  Winterberg
 Junior Two-man bobsleigh winners:  (Adam Ammour & Benedikt Hertel)
 Junior Four-man bobsleigh winners:  (Nico Semmler, Oliver Peschk, Rupert Schenk, & Marvin Paul)
 Junior Two-woman bobsleigh winners:  (Maureen Zimmer & Lauryn Siebert)
 Junior Women's Monobob winner:  Maureen Zimmer
 Junior Skeleton winners:  Cedric Renner (m) /  Hannah Neise (f)
 U23 Two-man bobsleigh winners:  (Laurin Zern & Marvin Orthmann)
 U23 Four-man bobsleigh winners:  (Laurin Zern, Jörn Wenzel, Tim Kesseler, & Marvin Orthmann)
 U23 Two-woman bobsleigh winners:  (Charlotte Candrix & Cynthia Kwofie)
 U23 Women's Monobob winner:  Charlotte Candrix
 U20 Skeleton winners:  Roman Tanzer (m) /  Hallie Clarke (f)
 January 20–22: IBSF European Championships 2023 in  Altenberg
 Two-man bobsleigh winners:  (Johannes Lochner & Erec Bruckert)
 Four-man bobsleigh winners:  (Brad Hall, Greg Cackett, Taylor Lawrence, & Arran Gulliver)
 Two-woman bobsleigh winners:  (Laura Nolte & Neele Schuten)
 Women's Monobob winner:  Laura Nolte
 Skeleton winners:  Matt Weston (m) /  Tina Hermann (f)
 January 26 – February 5: IBSF World Championships 2023 in  St. Moritz
 March 11 & 12: 2023 IBSF Asian Championships in  PyeongChang

B & S World Cup
 November 24–26, 2022: IBSF World Cup #1 in  Whistler
 Two-man bobsleigh winners:  (Francesco Friedrich & Alexander Schüller)
 Four-man bobsleigh winners:  (Francesco Friedrich, Alexander Schüller, Thorsten Margis, & Candy Bauer)
 Two-woman bobsleigh winners:  (Kim Kalicki & Anabel Galander)
 Women's Monobob winner:  Bianca Ribi
 Skeleton winners:  Marcus Wyatt (m) /  Hannah Neise (f)
 December 1–3, 2022: IBSF World Cup #2 in  Park City
 Two-man bobsleigh winners:  (Francesco Friedrich & Thorsten Margis)
 Four-man bobsleigh winners:  (Francesco Friedrich, Candy Bauer, Thorsten Margis, & Alexander Schüller)
 Two-woman bobsleigh winners:  (Kim Kalicki & Leonie Fiebig)
 Women's Monobob winner:  Kaillie Humphries
 Skeleton winners:  Christopher Grotheer (m) /  Mirela Rahneva (f)
 December 16–18, 2022: IBSF World Cup #3 in  Lake Placid
 Two-man bobsleigh winners:  (Johannes Lochner & Georg Fleischhauer)
 Four-man bobsleigh winners:  (Brad Hall, Taylor Lawrence, Arran Gulliver, & Greg Cackett)
 Two-woman bobsleigh winners:  (Kaillie Humphries & Kaysha Love)
 Women's Monobob winner:  Laura Nolte
 Skeleton winners:  Matt Weston (m) /  Tina Hermann (f)
 January 6–8: IBSF World Cup #4 in  Winterberg
 Two-man bobsleigh winners:  (Johannes Lochner & Georg Fleischhauer)
 Four-man bobsleigh winners:  (Francesco Friedrich, Candy Bauer, Alexander Schüller, & Thorsten Margis)
 Two-woman bobsleigh winners:  (Laura Nolte & Neele Schuten)
 Women's Monobob winner:  Laura Nolte
 Skeleton winners:  Christopher Grotheer (m) /  Kimberley Bos (f)
 January 13–15: IBSF World Cup #5 in  Altenberg #1
 Two-man bobsleigh winners:  (Johannes Lochner & Georg Fleischhauer)
 Four-man bobsleigh winners:  (Brad Hall, Taylor Lawrence, Arran Gulliver, & Greg Cackett)
 Two-woman bobsleigh winners:  (Lisa Buckwitz & Kira Lipperheide)
 Women's Monobob winner:  Kaillie Humphries
 Skeleton winners:  Matt Weston (m) /  Tina Hermann (f)
 January 20–22: IBSF World Cup #6 in  Altenberg #2
 Same results as the IBSF European Championships 2023 above, except for the following:
 Two-woman bobsleigh winners:  (Kaillie Humphries & Kaysha Love)
 Women's Mononbob winner:  Kaillie Humphries
 February 10–12: IBSF World Cup #7 in  Innsbruck
 February 17–19: IBSF World Cup #8 (final) in  Sigulda

American North Cup 
 November 9–13, 2022: North American Cup #1 in  Whistler
 Two-man bobsleigh winners:  Michael Vogt & Silvio Weber (1st) /  Simon Friedli & Andreas Haas (2nd)
 Four-man bobsleigh winners:  (Brad Hall, Arran Gulliver, Rory Willicombe, Taylor Lawrence) (1st) /  (Taylor Austin, Davidson De Souza, William Ashley, Cyrus Gray) (2nd)
 Two-woman bobsleigh winners:  Bianca Ribi & Niamh Haughey (2 times)
 Women's Monobob winners:  Kaillie Humphries (1st) /  Cynthia Appiah (2nd)
 Skeleton winners:  Austin Florian (1st) /  Florian Auer (2nd) (m) /  Hallie Clarke (1st) /  Anna Fernstädt (2nd) (f)
 November 18–23, 2022: North American Cup #2 in  Park City
 Two-man bobsleigh winners:  Kim Jin-su & Jung Hyun-woo (1st) /  Kim Jin-su & Lee Kyung-yeon (2nd)
 Two-woman bobsleigh winners:  Viktória Čerňanská & Lucia Kršková (1st) /  Lauren Brzozowski & Sydney Milani (2nd)
 Four-man bobsleigh winners:  (Kim Jin-su, Jung Hyun-woo, Kim Hyeong-geun, Lee Kyung-yeon) (2 times)
 Women's Monobob winners:  Lauren Brzozowski (1st) /  Viktória Čerňanská (2nd)
 Skeleton winners:  Brendan Doyle (2 times) (m) /  Jaclyn Laberge (1st) /  Kellie Delka (2nd) (f)

European Cup
 November 16–20, 2022: European Cup #1 in  Lillehammer
 Two-man bobsleigh winners:  Maximilian Illmann & Philipp Wobeto (1st) /  Maximilian Illmann & Lukas Koller (2nd)
 Four-man bobsleigh winners:  (Maximilian Illmann, Henrik Proske, Philipp Wobeto, Joshua Tasche) (1st) /  (Maximilian Illmann, Henrik Proske, Philipp Wobeto, Lukas Koller) (2nd)
 Two-woman bobsleigh winners:  Margot Boch & Carla Senechal (1st) /  Margot Boch & Talia Solitude (2nd) 
 Women's Monobob winners:  Margot Boch (2 times)
 Skeleton winners:  Haifeng Zhu (2 times) (m) /  Freya Tarbit (1st) /  Mystique Ro (2nd) (f)

Intercontinental Cup
 November 11–13, 2022: Intercontinental Cup #1 in  Lillehammer
 Skeleton winners:  Mattia Gaspari (2 times) (m) /  Mystique Ro (1st) /  Valentina Margaglio (2nd) (f)

Para Sport World Cup 
 November 19 & 20, 2022: Para Sport World Cup #1 in  Lake Placid
 Para Bobsleigh winner:  Guillermo Castillo (1st) /  Israel Blanco (2nd)

Boccia

Boccia World Championships
 July 7–16: 2023 World Boccia Youth Championships in  Vila do Conde

Continental/Regional Championships
 May 14–22: 2023 World Boccia Asia-Oceania Regional Championships in 
 July 2–10: 2023 World Boccia Africa Regional Championships in  Cairo
 August 6–14: 2023 World Boccia Europe Regional Championships in  Rotterdam

Bowling

Bowls

Boxing

IBA World Boxing Championships
 March 15–31: 2023 IBA Women's World Boxing Championships in  New Delhi
 May 1–14: 2023 IBA Men's World Boxing Championships in  Tashkent

Continental Boxing Championships
 January 16–27: 2023 ASBC Asian U22 Boxing Championships in  
 Minmum winners:  Sanzhar Tashkenbay (m) /  Farzona Fozilova (f)
 Women's Light Fly winner:  Sabina Bobokulova
 Fly winners:  Aaron Jude Bado (m) /  Feruza Kazakova (f)
 Bantam winners:  Nursultan Altynbek (m) /  Nigina Uktamova (f)
 Feather winners:  Makhmud Sabyrkhan (m) /  Battur Zoljargal (f)
 Light winners:  Dilshod Abdumurodov (m) /  Porntip Buapa (f)
 Light Welter winners:  Shakhboz Yunusaliev (m) /  Thananya Somnuek (f)
 Welter winners:  Bekhzod Khamidov (m) /  Navbakhor Khamidova (f)
 Light Middle winners:  Nurislom Ismoilov (m) /  Zhasmin Kizatova (f)
 Middle winners:  Alokhon Abdullaev (m) /  Baison Manikon (f)
 Light Heavy winners:  Jasurbek Yuldoshev (m) /  Gulsaya Yerzhan (f)
 Men's Cruiser winner:  Shokhjakhon Abdullaev
 Men's Heavy winner:  Nusratbek Tokhirov
 Men's Super Heavy winner:  Jakhongir Zokirov
 February 20–26: 2023 Oceania Youth Boxing Championships in  Apia
 May 22–29: 2023 Oceania Boxing Championships in  Wellington

World Boxing Tour
Golden Belt
 January 31 – February 12: IBA Golden Belt #1 in  Marrakesh
 TBA: IBA Golden Belt #2 in  Maribor

Bridge

Canadian football

Canadian Football League
 June 8 – October 28: 2023 CFL season
 November 19: 110th Grey Cup in  Hamilton

U Sports
 August 26 – November 18: 2023 U Sports football season
 November 25: 58th Vanier Cup

Canoeing

Canoe slalom
World & Continental Championships
 January 28–30: 2023 Oceania Canoe Slalom Championships in  Auckland
 April 28–30: 2023 Pan American Canoe Slalom Championships in  Três Coroas
 May 18–21: 2023 Asian Junior & U23 Canoe Slalom Championships in  Pattaya
 August 15–20: 2023 World Junior and U23 Canoe Slalom Championships in  Kraków
 September 19–24: 2023 ICF Canoe Slalom World Championships in  London
 October 27–29: 2023 Asian Canoe Slalom Championships in  Tokyo

Canoe Slalom World Cup
 June 2–4: CSWC #1 in  Augsburg
 June 9–11: CSWC #2 in  Prague
 June 16–18: CSWC #3 in  Ljubljana
 September 1–3: CSWC #4 in  La Seu d'Urgell
 October 5–8 CSWC #5 (final) in  Vaires-sur-Marne

Canoe sprint
World & Continental Championships
 July 6–9: 2023 World Junior and U23 Canoe Sprint Championships in  Auronzo di Cadore
 July 27–30: 2023 European Junior and U23 Canoe Sprint Championships in  Montemor-o-Velho
 August 23–27: 2023 ICF Canoe Sprint World Championships in  Duisburg

Canoe Sprint World Cup
 May 11–14: Canoe Sprint WC #1 in  Szeged
 May 26–28: Canoe Sprint WC #2 in  Poznań
 August 30 – September 1: Canoe Sprint WC #3 (final) in  Paris

Cheerleading
 TBD:2023 The Cheerleading Worlds

Cricket

2023 Tri Series 
 January 19 – February 2: 2022–23 South Africa women's Tri-Nation Series in 
 : , : , : 
 February 14–21: 2023 Nepal Tri-Nation Series in 
 February 27 – March 6: 2023 United Arab Emirates Tri-Nation Series in 
 March 9–16: 2023 Nepal Tri-Nation Series in

The Ashes
 June 16 – July 31: 2023 Ashes series

World Championships and World Cups 
 January 14–29: 2023 ICC Under-19 Women's T20 World Cup in 
 In the final,  def. , 69/3 (14 overs)–68 (17.1 overs). India won by 7 wickets.
 February 10–26: 2023 ICC Women's T20 World Cup in 
  Cricket World Cup, in India
 2021–23 ICC World Test Championship Final

Cross-country skiing

XC World Championships
 February 22 – March 5: FIS Nordic World Ski Championships 2023 in  Planica

XC Skiing World Cup
 November 25–27, 2022: World Cup #1 in  Rukatunturi
 Individual Start Classic winners:  Johannes Høsflot Klæbo (m) /  Ebba Andersson (f)
 Pursuit Free winners:  Johannes Høsflot Klæbo (m) /  Frida Karlsson (f)
 Sprint Final Classic winners:  Johannes Høsflot Klæbo (m) /  Emma Ribom (f)
 December 2–4, 2022: World Cup #2 in  Lillehammer
 Individual Start Free winners:  Iver Tildheim Andersen (m) /  Jessie Diggins (f)
 Mass Start Classic winners:  Pål Golberg (m) /  Frida Karlsson (f)
 Sprint Final Free winners:  Johannes Høsflot Klæbo (m) /  Emma Ribom (f)
 December 9–11, 2022: World Cup #3 in  Beitostølen
 Individual Start Classic winners:  Pål Golberg (m) /  Kerttu Niskanen (f)
 Sprint Final Classic winners:  Richard Jouve (m) /  Nadine Fähndrich (f)
 4x5 km Relay Classic/Free winners:  (Lotta Udnes Weng, Mikael Gunnulfsen, Silje Theodorsen, & Simen Hegstad Krüger)
 December 17 & 18, 2022: World Cup #4 in  Davos
 Individual Start Free winners:  Simen Hegstad Krüger (m) /  Jessie Diggins (f)
 Sprint Final Free winners:  Federico Pellegrino (m) /  Nadine Fähndrich (f)
 December 31, 2022 & January 1: World Cup #5 in  Val Müstair
 Pursuit Classic winners:  Johannes Høsflot Klæbo (m) /  Tiril Udnes Weng (f)
 Sprint Final Free winners:  Johannes Høsflot Klæbo (m) /  Nadine Fähndrich (f)
 January 3 & 4: World Cup #6 in  Oberstdorf
 Men's Individual Start Classic & Pursuit Free winner:  Johannes Høsflot Klæbo
 Women's Individual Start Classic & Pursuit Free winner:  Frida Karlsson
 January 6–8: World Cup #7 in  Fiemme Valley
 Mass Start Classic winners:  Johannes Høsflot Klæbo (m) /  Katharina Hennig (f)
 Mass Start Free winners:  Simen Hegstad Krüger (m) /  Delphine Claudel (f)
 Sprint Final Classic winners:  Johannes Høsflot Klæbo (m) /  Lotta Udnes Weng (f)
 January 21 & 22: Original World Cup #8 in  Milan
 All events here are cancelled.
 January 21 & 22: Replaced World Cup #8 in  Livigno
 Sprint Final Free winners:  Johannes Høsflot Klæbo (m) /  Jonna Sundling (f)
 Men's Team Sprint Free winners:  (Renaud Jay & Richard Jouve)
 Women's Team Sprint Free winners:  (Linn Svahn & Maja Dahlqvist)
 January 27–29: World Cup #9 in  Les Rousses
 Individual Start Free winners:  Harald Østberg Amundsen (m) /  Ebba Andersson (f)
 Mass Start Classic winners:  Johannes Høsflot Klæbo (m) /  Ebba Andersson (f)
 Sprint Final Classic winners:  Richard Jouve (m) /  Kristine Stavås Skistad (f)
 February 3–5: World Cup #10 in  Toblach
 Individual Start Free winners: (m) / (f)
 Sprint Final Free winners: (m) / (f)
 4x7.5km Relay Classic/Free winners: 
 March 11 & 12: World Cup #11 in  Oslo
 March 14: World Cup #12 in  Drammen
 March 17–19: World Cup #13 in  Falun
 March 21: World Cup #14 in  Tallinn
 March 24–26: World Cup #15 (final) in  Lahti

2022–23 FIS Cross-Country Continental Cup

Australia/New Zealand Cup
 July 30 & 31, 2022: ANC #1 in  Falls Creek Alpine Resort
 Sprint Classic winners:  Lars Young Vik (m) /  Katerina Paul (f)
 Men's 15 km Freestyle winner:  Phillip Bellingham
 Women's 10 km Freestyle winner:  Zana Evans
 August 20 & 21, 2022: ANC #2 in  Perisher Ski Resort
 Sprint Freestyle winners:  Lars Young Vik (m) /  Katerina Paul (f)
 Men's 10 km Classic winner:  Seve de Campo
 Women's 5 km Classic winner:  Phoebe Cridland

East European Cup
 November 13–15, 2022: EEC #1 in  Shchuchinsk
 Sprint Classic winners:  Konstantin Bortsov (m) /  Anna Melnik (f)
 Men's 10 km Individual Classic winner:  Vitaliy Pukhkalo
 Women's 10 km Individual Classic winner:  Kseniya Shalygina
 Men's 15 km Individual Free winner:  Vitaliy Pukhkalo
 Women's 15 km Individual Free winner:  Kseniya Shalygina

North American Cup
 November 30 – December 4, 2022: NAC #1 in  Vernon
 Sprint Classic winners:  Magnus Bøe (m) /  Hailey Swirbul (f)
 Mass Start winners:  Tom Mancini (m) /  Anna-Maria Dietze (f)
 Sprint Freestyle winners:  Andreas Kirkeng (m) /  Hailey Swirbul (f)
 10 km Classic winners:  Andreas Kirkeng (m) /  Hailey Swirbul (f)

South American Cup
 September 2–4, 2022: SAC #1 in  Cerro Catedral
 Sprint Classic winners:  Franco Dal Farra (m) /  Maira Sofía Fernández Righi (f)
 Men's 10 km Individual Classic winner:  Franco Dal Farra
 Women's 5 km Individual Classic winner:  Agustina Groetzner
 Men's 10 km Individual Free winner:  Franco Dal Farra
 Women's 5 km Individual Free winner:  Nahiara Díaz
 September 21 & 22, 2022: #2 in  Corralco
 Men's 10 km Individual Free winner:  Franco Dal Farra
 Women's 7.5 km Individual Free winner:  María Cecilia Domínguez
 Sprint Freestyle winners:  Franco Dal Farra (m) /  María Cecilia Domínguez (f)

Cue sports

Curling

2022–23 International curling championships
 October 15–22, 2022: 2022 World Mixed Curling Championship in  Aberdeen
  (Skip: Jean-Michel Ménard) defeated  (Skip: Cameron Bryce), 7–4, to win their third consecutive World Mixed Curling Championship title.
  (Skip: Ursi Hegner) took third place.
 October 31 – November 6, 2022: 2022 Pan Continental Curling Championships in  Calgary (debut event)
 Men's A:  (Skip: Brad Gushue) defeated  (Skip: Jeong Byeong-jin), 11–3, to win the inaugural Pan Continental Curling Championships title.
 The  (Skip: Korey Dropkin) took third place.
 Women's A:  (Skip: Satsuki Fujisawa) defeated  (Skip: Ha Seung-youn), 8–6, to win the inaugural Pan Continental Curling Championships title.
  (Skip: Kerri Einarson) took third place.
 November 19–26, 2022: 2022 European Curling Championships in  Östersund
 Men:  (Skip: Bruce Mouat) defeated  (Skip: Yannick Schwaller), 5–4, to win their 15th European Curling Championships title.
  (Skip: Joël Retornaz) took third place.
 Women:  (Skip: Madeleine Dupont) defeated  (Skip: Silvana Tirinzoni), 8–4, to win their second European Curling Championships title.
  (Skip: Rebecca Morrison) took third place.
 February 25 – March 4: 2023 World Junior Curling Championships in  Füssen
 March 4–12: 2023 World Wheelchair Curling Championship in  Richmond
 March 4–12: 2023 World Wheelchair Mixed Doubles Curling Championship in  Richmond
 March 18–26: 2023 World Women's Curling Championship in  Sandviken
 April 1–9: 2023 World Men's Curling Championship in  Ottawa
 April 22–29: 2023 World Mixed Doubles Curling Championship in  Gangneung
 April 22–29: 2023 World Senior Curling Championships in  Gangneung

2022–23 Season of Champions
 September 21–25, 2022: 2022 PointsBet Invitational in  Fredericton (debut event)
 Men: Team  Reid Carruthers defeated Team  Matt Dunstone, 8–4, to win the inaugural PointsBet Invitational title.
 Women: Team  Jennifer Jones defeated Team  Casey Scheidegger, 7–4, to win the inaugural PointsBet Invitational title.
 Note for Women: Kristie Moore replaced Casey Scheidegger.
 February 17–26: 2023 Scotties Tournament of Hearts in  Kamloops
 March 3–12: 2023 Tim Hortons Brier in  London

2022–23 Grand Slam of Curling
 October 4–9, 2022: 2022 National in  North Bay
 Men: Team  Brad Gushue defeated Team  Niklas Edin, 5–4, to win their fourth National title.
 Women: Team  Silvana Tirinzoni defeated Team  Kerri Einarson, 7–3, to win their first National title.
 October 18–23, 2022: 2022 Tour Challenge in  Grande Prairie
 Men's Tier 1: Team  Niklas Edin defeated Team  Matt Dunstone, 7–3, to win their second Tour Challenge title.
 Note for Men's Tier 1: Oskar Eriksson was the skip for the semifinal and final of this event.
 Women's Tier 1: Team  Tracy Fleury defeated Team  Kerri Einarson, 8–4, to win their second Tour Challenge title.
 December 6–11, 2022: 2022 Masters in  Oakville
 Men: Team  Joël Retornaz defeated Team  Bruce Mouat, 6–2, to win their first Masters title.
 Women: Team  Kerri Einarson defeated Team  Tracy Fleury, 6–5, to win their first Masters title.
 January 10–15: 2023 Canadian Open in  Camrose
 Men: Team  Brendan Bottcher defeated Team  Niklas Edin, 5–3, to win Alberta's eighth Canadian Open title.
 Women: Team  Satsuki Fujisawa defeated Team  Kerri Einarson, 5–3, to win Japan's first Canadian Open title.
 April 11–16: 2023 Players' Championship in  Toronto
 May 2–7: 2023 Champions Cup in  Regina

Cycle ball

Cycling – BMX

2023 UCI BMX Freestyle World Cup 
 February 15 – 18: World Cup #1 in  Diriyah
 Winners:  Logan Martin (m) /  Hannah Roberts (f)

Cycling – Cross

 February 3 – 5: 2023 UCI Cyclo-cross World Championships in  Hoogerheide
 Elite winners:  Mathieu van der Poel (m) /  Fem van Empel (f)
 U23 winners:  Thibau Nys (m) /  Shirin van Anrooij (f)
 Juniors winners:  Léo Bisiaux (m) /  Isabella Holmgren (f)

2022–23 UCI Cyclo-cross World Cup
 October 9, 2022: UCI Cyclo-cross World Cup #1 in  Waterloo 
 Winners:  Eli Iserbyt (m) /  Fem van Empel (f)
 October 16, 2022: UCI Cyclo-cross World Cup #2 in  Fayetteville 
 Winners:  Eli Iserbyt (m) /  Fem van Empel (f)
 October 23, 2022: UCI Cyclo-cross World Cup #3 in  Tábor 
 Winners:  Eli Iserbyt (m) /  Fem van Empel (f)
 U23 winner:  Thibau Nys
 Juniors winners:  Léo Bisiaux (m) /  Lauren Molengraaf
 October 30, 2022: UCI Cyclo-cross World Cup #4 in  Maasmechelen 
 Winners:  Laurens Sweeck (m) /  Fem van Empel (f)
 U23 winner:  Thibau Nys
 Juniors winners:  Guus van den Einden (m) /  Lauren Molengraaf
 November 13, 2022: UCI Cyclo-cross World Cup #5 in  Hilvarenbeek 
 Winners:  Laurens Sweeck (m) /  Shirin van Anrooij (f)
 November 20, 2022: UCI Cyclo-cross World Cup #6 in  Overijse 
 Winners:  Michael Vanthourenhout (m) /  Puck Pieterse (f)
 November 27, 2022: UCI Cyclo-cross World Cup #7 in  Hulst 
 Winners:  Mathieu van der Poel (m) /  Puck Pieterse (f)
 December 4, 2022: UCI Cyclo-cross World Cup #8 in  Antwerp 
 Winners:  Mathieu van der Poel (m) /  Fem van Empel (f)
 December 11, 2022: UCI Cyclo-cross World Cup #9 in  Dublin 
 Winners:  Wout van Aert (m) /  Fem van Empel (f)
 December 17, 2022: UCI Cyclo-cross World Cup #10 in  Val di Sole 
 Winners:  Michael Vanthourenhout (m) /  Puck Pieterse (f)
 December 26, 2022: UCI Cyclo-cross World Cup #11 in  Gavere 
 Winners:  Mathieu van der Poel (m) /  Shirin van Anrooij (f)
 January 8: UCI Cyclo-cross World Cup #12 in  Zonhoven 
 Winners:  Wout van Aert (m) /  Shirin van Anrooij (f)
 U23 winner:  Thibau Nys
 Juniors winners:  Léo Bisiaux (m) /  Lauren Molengraaf (f)
 January 22: UCI Cyclo-cross World Cup #13 in  Benidorm 
 Winners:  Mathieu van der Poel (m) /  Fem van Empel (f)
 U23 winner:  Thibau Nys
 Juniors winners:  Yordi Corsus (m) /  Lauren Molengraaf (f)
 January 29: UCI Cyclo-cross World Cup #14 in  Besançon (final)
 Winners: /  Puck Pieterse (f)
 U23 winner:  Tibor del Grosso
 Juniors winners:  Seppe van den Boer (m) /  Ava Holmgren (f)
 Overall winners:  Laurens Sweeck (m) /  Fem van Empel (f)

Cycling – Gran Fondo

2022–2023 UCI Gran Fondo World Series
 September 11, 2022: Amy's Great Ocean Road Gran Fondo in 
 Winners:  Tynan Shannon (m) /  Jennifer Pettenon (f)
 October 1 & 2, 2022: Tre Valli Varesine Gran Fondo in 
 Winners:  Michele Paonne (m) /  Monika Veitová (f)
 October 14–16, 2022: Tour de Bintan in 
 Winners:  Mathieu Bédard (m) /  Ava Woo (f)
 November 17–20, 2022: GranFondo Antalya in 
 Winners:  Emir Demir (m) /  Meltem Kılıç (f)
 February 2–4: UCI Granfondo Jordan Dead Sea in 
 Winners:  Sergey Trubetskoy (m) /  Meredith Byrne (f)

Cycling – Road

 February 8–13: 2023 CAC African Continental Road Championships in  Accra
 Elite RR winners:  Henok Mulubrhan (m) /  Ese Lovina Ukpeseraye (f)
 Elite ITT winners:  Charles Kagimu (m) /  Aurelie Halbwachs (f)
 U23 RR winners:  Renus Byiza Uhiriwe (m) /  Diane Ingabire (f)
 U23 ITT winners:  Kiya Rogora (m) /  Nesrine Houili (f)
 Juniors RR winners:  Riad Bakhti (m) /  Malak Mechab	(f)
 Juniors ITT winners:  Djaoued Nhari (m) /  Siham Bousba (f)
 Elite TTT winners:  (Hamza Amari, Hamza Mansouri, Nassim Saidi, Azzedine Lagab) (m) /  (Raphaëlle Lamusse, Kimberley Le Court, Lucie de Marigny-Lagesse, Aurelie Halbwachs) (f)
 Juniors TTT winners:  (Riad Bakhti, Nasrallah Essemiani, Bachir Chennafi, Djaoued Chams Eddine Nhari) (m) /  (Mechab Malik, Soulef Silmi, Siham Bousba, Hosna Bellile) (f)
 Mixed TT winners:  (Aurelie Halbwachs, Raphaëlle Lamusse, Kimberley Le Court, Alexandre Mayer, Gregory Mayer, Christopher Lagane)

2023 UCI World Tour
 January 17–22: 2023 Tour Down Under in 
 Winner:  Jay Vine
 January 29: 2023 Cadel Evans Great Ocean Road Race in 
 Winner:  Marius Mayrhofer
 February 20–26: 2023 UAE Tour in 
 Winner:  Remco Evenepoel
 February 25: 2023 Omloop Het Nieuwsblad in 
 Winner:  Dylan van Baarle
 March 4: 2023 Strade Bianche in 
 Winner:  Tom Pidcock

2023 UCI ProSeries
 January 22–29: 2023 Vuelta a San Juan in 
 Winner:  Miguel Ángel López
 February 1 – 5: 2023 Volta a la Comunitat Valenciana in 
 Winner:  Rui Costa
 February 11–15: 2023 Tour of Oman in 
 Winner:  Matteo Jorgenson
 February 12: 2023 Clásica de Almería in 
 Winner:  Matteo Moschetti
 February 15–19: 2023 Volta ao Algarve in 
 Winner:  Daniel Martínez
 February 15–19: 2023 Vuelta a Andalucía in 
 Winner:  Tadej Pogačar
 February 25: 2023 Faun-Ardèche Classic in 
 Winner:  Julian Alaphilippe
 February 26: 2023 Kuurne–Brussels–Kuurne in 
 Winner:  Tiesj Benoot
 February 26: 2023 Faun Drôme Classic in 
 Winner:  Anthony Perez
 March 1: 2023 Trofeo Laigueglia in 
 Winner:  Nans Peters

2023 UCI Women's World Tour
 January 15–17: 2023 Women's Tour Down Under in 
 Winner:  Grace Brown
 January 28: 2023 Cadel Evans Great Ocean Road Race in 
 Winner:  Loes Adegeest
 February 9–12: 2023 UAE Tour in 
 Winner:  Elisa Longo Borghini
 February 25: 2023 Omloop Het Nieuwsblad in 
 Winner:  Lotte Kopecky

2023 UCI Women's ProSeries
 February 15–19: 2023 Setmana Valenciana-Volta Comunitat Valenciana Fémines in 
 Winner:  Justine Ghekiere

Cycling – Track

 February 8 – 12: 2023 UEC European Track Championships in  Grenchen
 : , : , : 
 March 5–9: 2023 African Track Cycling Championships in  Cairo
 March 23–25: 2023 Asian Track Cycling Championships in  Thiruvananthapuram
 March 24–28: 2023 Oceania Track Championships in  Brisbane

2023 UCI Track Nations Cup
 February 23 – 26: TNC #1 in  Jakarta
 March 14–17: TNC #2 in  Cairo

Darts

Professional Darts Corporation
 December 15, 2022 – January 3: 2023 PDC World Darts Championship in  London
  Michael Smith defeated  Michael van Gerwen, 7–4.
 January 27–29: 2023 Masters in  Milton Keynes
  Chris Dobey defeated  Rob Cross, 11–7.
 February 2 – May 25: 2023 Premier League Darts 
 March 3–5: 2023 UK Open in  Minehead
  Andrew Gilding defeated  Michael van Gerwen, 11–10.
 June 15–17: 2023 PDC World Cup of Darts in  Frankfurt
 July 15–23: 2023 World Matchplay in  Blackpool
 October 2–8: 2023 World Grand Prix in  Leicester
 October 26–29: 2023 European Championship in  Dortmund
 November 11–19: 2023 Grand Slam of Darts in  Wolverhampton
 November 24–26: 2023 Players Championship Finals in  Minehead

World Series of Darts
 January 12–13: 2023 Bahrain Darts Masters in  Sakhir
  Michael Smith defeated  Gerwyn Price, 8–6.
 January 20–21: 2023 Nordic Darts Masters in  Copenhagen
  Peter Wright defeated  Gerwyn Price, 11–5.
 June 2–3: 2023 US Darts Masters in  New York City
 August 4–5: 2023 New Zealand Darts Masters in  Hamilton
 August 11–12: 2023 New South Wales Darts Masters in  Wollongong
 September 15–16: 2023 World Series of Darts Finals in  Amsterdam

World Darts Federation
 December 2–10: 2022 WDF World Darts Championship in  Frimley Green

Dance sport

Dance sport World & Continental Championships
 January 14: WDSF European Championship (Senior IV Standard) in  Cartagena
 :  Roberto Furlan & Daniela Sattin, :  Michael Pauser & Claudia Molecz, :  Olivier Gastaldi & Muriel Haegel Gastaldi

2023 World Open
 January 28: World Open #1 in  Pforzheim
 Winners:  Charles-Guillaume Schmitt & Elena Salikhova
 February 11 & 12: World Open #2 in  Antwerp

2023 BfG World Series
 February 24 & 25: BfG World Series #1 in  Kitakyushu

Dodgeball

Disc golf

Fencing

Fencing World & Continental Championships
 February 18–20: 2023 African Junior Fencing Championships in  Accra
 February 25–28: 2023 European Cadets and Juniors Fencing Championships in  Tallinn
 February 28 – March 6: 2023 Pan American Cadets and Juniors Fencing Championships in  Bogotá
 March 5–8: 2023 Asian Cadets and Juniors Fencing Championships in  Tashkent
 April 1–9: 2023 World Cadets and Juniors Fencing Championships in  Plovdiv
 July 22–28: 2023 World Fencing Championships in  Milan
 TBA: 2023 African Fencing Championships
 TBA: 2023 European Fencing Championships
 TBA: 2023 Pan American Fencing Championships
 TBA: 2023 Asian Fencing Championships

Fencing World Cup & Grand Prix – Senior Épée
Men
 November 11–13, 2022: Men's SE #1 in  Bern
 Individual winner:  Tibor Andrasfi
 Team winners:  (Alexandre Bardenet, Yannick Borel, Romain Cannone, & Alex Fava)
 December 9–11, 2022: Men's SE #2 in  Vancouver
 Individual winner:  Gergely Siklósi
 Team winners:  (Paul Allegre, Kendrick Jean Joseph, Nelson Lopez Pourtier, & Arthur Philippe)
 January 28 & 29: Men's Grand Prix #1 in  Doha
 Individual winner:  Gergely Siklósi
 February 23–25: Men's SE #3 in  Heidenheim
 March 10–12: Men's Grand Prix #2 in  Budapest
 March 24–26: Men's SE #4 in  Buenos Aires
 May 5–7: Men's Grand Prix #3 in  Cali
 May 19–21: Men's SE #5 (final) in  Saint-Maur-des-Fossés

Women
 November 11–13, 2022: Women's SE #1 in  Tallinn
 Individual winner:  Alberta Santuccio
 Team winners:  (Rossella Fiamingo, Federica Isola, Roberta Marzani, & Giulia Rizzi)
 December 8–11, 2022: Women's SE #2 in  Vancouver
 Individual winner:  Giulia Rizzi
 Team winners:  (Marie-Florence Candassamy, Joséphine Jacques-André-Coquin, Alexandra Louis Marie, & Auriane Mallo)
 January 27–29: Women's Grand Prix #1 in  Doha
 Individual winner:  Nathalie Moellhausen
 February 10–12: Women's SE #3 in  Barcelona
 March 10–12: Women's Grand Prix #2 in  Budapest
 March 24–26: Women's SE #4 in  Chengdu
 May 5–7: Women's Grand Prix #3 in  Cali
 May 19–21: Women's SE #5 (final) in  Abu Dhabi

Fencing World Cup – Junior Épée
Men
 November 5 & 6, 2022: Men's JE #1 in  San José
 Individual winner:  Kruz Schembri
 Team winners:  (BAE Jun-ho, KIM Hyun-bin, KIM Dong-hyeok, & LEE Ji-seong)
 November 19 & 20, 2022: Men's JE #2 in  Riga
 Individual winner:  Simone Mencarelli
 Team winners:  (Gabriel Feinberg, Henry Lawson, Skyler Liverant, & Thomas Whelan)
 December 3 & 4, 2022: Men's JE #3 in  Tashkent
 Individual winner:  Bogdan Lukin
 Team winners:  (Mohamed Elsayed, Mahmoud Elsayed, Mohamed Gaber, & Mohamed Yasseen)
 December 17 & 18, 2022: Men's JE #4 in  Heraklion
 Individual winner:  Marco Paganelli
 Team winners:  (Fabrizio Cuomo, Nicolo' del Contrasto, Matteo Galassi, & Simone Mencarelli)
 January 6 & 7: Men's JE #5 in  Udine
 Individual winner:  Mohamed Elsayed
 Team winners:  (Mahmoud Elsayed, Mohamed Elsayed, Youssef Shamel, & Mohamed Yasseen)
 January 21 & 22: Men's JE #6 in  Manama
 Individual winner:  Mohamed Elsayed
 Team winners:  (Mohamed Elsayed, Mahmoud Elsayed, Mohamed Gaber, & Mohamed Yasseen)
 February 4 & 5: Men's JE #7 in  Basel
 February 18 & 19: Men's JE #8 (final) in  Belgrade

Women
 November 4–6, 2022: Women's JE #1 in  San José
 Individual winner:  Yeva Mazur
 Team winners:  (Shakhzoda Egamberdieva, Dilnaz Murzataeva, Sevara Rakhimova, & Biybimaryam Saparova)
 November 19 & 20, 2022: Women's JE #2 in  Tashkent
 Individual winner:  Sevara Rakhimova
 Team winners:  (Shakhzoda Egamberdieva, Dilnaz Murzataeva, Sevara Rakhimova, & Biybimaryam Saparova)
 December 3 & 4, 2022: Women's JE #3 in  Laupheim
 Individual winner:  Hadley Husisian
 Team winners:  (Gaia Caforio, Carola Maccagno, Lucrezia Paulis, & Vittoria Siletti)
 December 17 & 18, 2022: Women's JE #4 in  Burgos
 Individual winner:  Michaela Joyce
 Team winners:  (Anaelle Doquet, Oceane Francillonne, Garance Palpacuer, & Elena Seille)
 January 7 & 8: Women's JE #5 in  Udine
 Individual winner:  Alexandra Kravets
 Team winners:  (Cecylia Cieslik, Alicja Klasik, Gloria Klughardt, & Kinga Zgryzniak)
 January 21 & 22: Women's JE #6 in  Ma'alot-Tarshiha
 Individual winner:  Isabella Chin
 Team winners:  (Adele Bogdanov, Nicole Feygin, Alexandra Kravets, & Sophia Vainberg)
 February 4 & 5: Women's JE #7 in  Istanbul
 February 18 & 19: Women's JE #8 (final) in  Beauvais

Fencing World Cup & Grand Prix – Senior Foil
Men
 November 11–13, 2022: Men's SF #1 in  Bonn
 Individual winner:  Kyosuke Matsuyama
 Team winners:  (Chase Emmer, Nick Itkin, Alexander Massialas, & Gerek Meinhardt)
 December 9–11, 2022: Men's SF #2 in  Tokyo
 Individual winner:  Tommaso Marini
 Team winners:  (Miles Chamley-Watson, Nick Itkin, Alexander Massialas, & Gerek Meinhardt)
 January 12–14: Men's SF #3 in  Paris
 Individual winner:  Alexander Massialas
 Team winners:  (Guillaume Bianchi, Alessio Foconi, Daniele Garozzo, & Tommaso Marini)
 February 10–12: Men's Grand Prix #1 in  Turin
 February 23–26: Men's SF #4 in  Cairo
 March 17–19: Men's Grand Prix #2 in  Busan
 May 5–7: Men's SF #5 in  Acapulco
 May 19–21: Men's Grand Prix #3 (final) in  Shanghai

Women
 December 9–11, 2022: Women's SF #1 in  Belgrade
 Individual winner:  Alice Volpi
 Team winners:  (Erica Cipressa, Martina Favaretto, Francesca Palumbo, & Alice Volpi)
 January 12–14: Women's SF #2 in  Paris
 Individual winner:  Alice Volpi
 Team winners:  (Erica Cipressa, Martina Favaretto, Francesca Palumbo, & Alice Volpi)
 February 10–12: Women's Grand Prix #1 in  Turin
 February 23–26: Women's SF #3 in  Cairo
 March 17–19: Women's Grand Prix #2 in  Busan
 April 21–23: Women's SF #4 in  Poznań
 May 5–7: Women's SF #5 in  Tauberbischofsheim
 May 19–21: Women's Grand Prix #3 (final) in  Shanghai

Fencing World Cup – Junior Foil
Men
 November 4 & 5, 2022: Men's JF #1 in  London
 Individual winner:  Chase Emmer
 Team winners:  (Ryosuke Fukuda, Shoren Hayashi, Kazuki Iimura, & Yuki Kikumoto)
 November 18–20, 2022: Men's JF #2 in  Lima
 Individual winner:  Ethan Um
 Team winners:  (Sanjay Kasi, William Kelly, Samarth Kumbla, & Enoch Xiao)
 December 3 & 4, 2022: Men's JF #3 in  Leszno
 Individual winner:  Anas Anane
 Team winners:  (Wael Abdeljalil, Anas Anane, Eliot Chagnon, & Adrien Spichiger)
 December 16–18, 2022: Men's JF #4 in  Bangkok
 Individual winner:  Anas Anane
 Team winners:  (William Kelly, Samarth Kumbla, Richard Li, & Luao Yang)
 January 7 & 8: Men's JF #5 in  Udine
 Individual winner:  Giuseppe Franzoni
 Team winners:  (Raian Adoul, Damiano di Veroli, Giuseppe Franzoni, & Mattia Raimondi)
 January 21 & 22: Men's JF #6 in  Aix-en-Provence
 Individual winner:  Wael Abdeljalil
 Team winners:  (Chase Emmer, William Kelly, Samarth Kumbla, & Brandon Li)
 February 4 & 5: Men's JF #7 in  São Paulo
 February 18 & 19: Men's JF #8 (final) in  Sabadell

Women
 November 4 & 5, 2022: Women's JF #1 in  London
 Individual winner:  Giulia Amore
 Team winners:  (Arianna Cao, Rachael Kim, Chin-Yi Kong, & Zander Rhodes)
 November 19 & 20, 2022: Women's JF #2 in  Lima
 Individual winner:  Carolina Stutchbury
 Team winners:  (Luca Kalocsai, Réka Kovács, Gréta Marosi, & Eszter Wolf)
 December 3 & 4, 2022: Women's JF #3 in  Tashkent
 Individual winner:  Almıla Birçe Durukan
 Team winners:  (Andreea Dinca, Teodora Şofran, Maria Teodorescu, & Karina Vasile)
 December 16–18, 2022: Women's JF #4 in  Bangkok
 Individual winner:  Daphne Nok-Sze Chan
 Team winners:  (Arianna Cao, Emily Jing, Rachael Kim, & Sophia Shen)
 January 6 & 7: Women's JF #5 in  Udine
 Individual winner:  Aurora Grandis
 Team winners:  (Giulia Amore, Matilde Calvanese, Carlotta Ferrari, & Aurora Grandis)
 January 21 & 22: Women's JF #6 in  Zagreb
 Individual winner:  Carlotta Ferrari
 Team winners:  (Arianna Cao, Zander Rhodes, Lauren Scruggs, & Sophia Shen)
 February 4 & 5: Women's JF #7 in  Jena
 February 18 & 19: Women's JF #8 (final) in  Mödling

Fencing World Cup & Grand Prix – Senior Sabre
Men
 November 10–13, 2022: Men's SS #1 in  Algiers
 Individual winner:  Sandro Bazadze
 Team winners:  (Gu Bon-gil, Kim Jung-hwan, Kim Jun-ho, & Oh Sang-uk)
 December 8–10, 2022: Men's Grand Prix #1 in  Orléans
 Individual winner:  Áron Szilágyi
 January 13–15: Men's Grand Prix #2 in  Tunis
 Individual winner:  Sandro Bazadze
 February 10–12: Men's SS #2 in  Warsaw
 March 2–4: Men's SS #3 in  Padua
 March 24–26: Men's SS #4 in  Budapest
 April 27–29: Men's Grand Prix #3 in  Seoul
 May 12–14: Men's SS #5 (final) in  Madrid

Women
 November 10–13, 2022: Women's SS #1 in  Algiers
 Individual winner:  Lucía Martín-Portugués
 Team winners:  (Manon Apithy-Brunet, Sara Balzer, Anne Poupinet, & Caroline Queroli)
 December 9 & 10, 2022: Women's Grand Prix #1 in  Orléans
 Individual winner:  Martina Criscio
 January 14 & 15: Women's Grand Prix #2 in  Tunis
 Individual winner:  Despina Georgiadou
 February 10–12: Women's SS #2 in  Tashkent
 March 3–5: Women's SS #3 in  Athens
 March 17–19: Women's SS #4 in  Sint-Niklaas
 April 27–29: Women's Grand Prix #3 in  Seoul
 May 12–14: Women's SS #5 (final) in  Batumi

Fencing World Cup – Junior Sabre
Men
 November 5 & 6, 2022: Men's JS #1 in  Tehran
 Individual winner:  KIM Jun-hyeong
 Team winners:  (KIM Jun-hyeong, KIM Ga-kyeong, KIM Min-jun, & NA Min-uk)
 November 19 & 20, 2022: Men's JS #2 in  Hammamet
 Individual winner:  Santiago Madrigal
 Team winners:  (Ahmed Hesham, Eyad Marouf, Adham Moataz, & Zeyad Nofal)
 December 3 & 4, 2022: Men's JS #3 in  Sosnowiec
 Individual winner:  Todor Stoychev
 Team winners:  (Edoardo Cantini, Marco Mastrullo, Emanuele Nardella, & Leonardo Tocci)
 December 17 & 18, 2022: Men's JS #4 in  Dormagen
 Individual winner:  Colin Heathcock
 Team winners:  (Tomoaki Chano, Yuto Hirata, Reo Hiwatashi, & Hayato Tsubo)
 January 7 & 8: Men's JS #5 in  Budapest
 Individual winner:  Remi Garrigue
 Team winners:  (Edoardo Cantini, Marco Mastrullo, Emanuele Nardella, & Leonardo Tocci)
 January 21 & 22: Men's JS #6 in  Lima
 Individual winner:  Musa Aymuratov
 Team winners:  (Islambek Abdazov, Musa Aymuratov, Azizbek Dauletnazarov, & Zuhriddin Kodirov)
 February 3–5: Men's JS #7 in  Plovdiv
 February 18 & 19: Men's JS #8 (final) in  Dourdan

Women
 November 5 & 6, 2022: Women's JS #1 in  Almaty
 Individual winner:  KIM Na-ae
 Team winners:  (Begüm Alkaya, Damla Demirkol, Nisanur Erbil, & Nil Gungor)
 November 19 & 20, 2022: Women's JS #2 in  Tashkent
 Individual winner:  Nisanur Erbil
 Team winners:  (Luisa Fernanda Herrera Lara, Nargiza Jaksybaeva, Gulistan Perdibaeva, & Samira Shokirova)
 December 2–4, 2022: Women's JS #3 in  Sosnowiec
 Individual winner:  Carlotta Fusetti
 Team winners:  (Cyrielle Girardin, Mathilde Mouroux, Toscane Tori, & Lola Tranquille)
 December 17 & 18, 2022: Women's JS #4 in  Dormagen
 Individual winner:  Magda Skarbonkiewicz
 Team winners:  (Tatiana Nazlymov, Kaitlyn Pak, Magda Skarbonkiewicz, & Siobhan Sullivan)
 January 7 & 8: Women's JS #5 in  Budapest
 Individual winner:  Carlotta Fusetti
 Team winners:  (Kíra Keszei, Zsanett Kovács, Viktória Zoe Pápai, & Anna Spiesz)
 January 21 & 22: Women's JS #6 in  Segovia
 Individual winner:  Carlotta Fusetti
 Team winners:  (Begüm Alkaya, Damla Demirkol, Nisanur Erbil, & Nil Gungor)
 February 3–5: Women's JS #7 in  Plovdiv
 February 18 & 19: Women's JS #8 (final) in  Batumi

Field hockey

Hockey World Cup
 January 13–29: 2023 Men's FIH Hockey World Cup in  Bhubaneswar–Rourkela
  ;  ;  
 February 4–10: 2023 Men's FIH Indoor Hockey World Cup in  Pretoria
 February 4–10: 2023 Women's FIH Indoor Hockey World Cup in  Pretoria

European Hockey Federation
 August 18–27: 2023 Men's EuroHockey Championship in  Mönchengladbach
 August 18–27: 2023 Women's EuroHockey Championship in  Mönchengladbach

Indoor hockey
 January 13–15: 2023 Women's Indoor EuroHockey U21 Championships in  Lucerne
  ;  The ;  
 January 19–22: 2023 Men's Indoor EuroHockey U21 Championships in  Nymburk
  ;  ;  

Clubs competitions
 September 29, 2022 – April 10: 2022–23 Men's Euro Hockey League and 2023 Women's Euro Hockey League (final8 in  Amstelveen)
 February 10 – 12: 2023 EuroHockey Indoor Club Challenge I in  Lousada
 February 17 – 19: 2023 Men's EuroHockey Indoor Club Cup in  Alanya
 February 17 – 19: 2023 EuroHockey Indoor Club Trophy in  Mannheim
 February 17 – 19: 2023 EuroHockey Indoor Women's Club Trophy in  Cambrai
 February 17 – 19: 2023 EuroHockey Club Indoor Women's Challenge I in  Skierniewice
 February 24 – 26: 2023 Women's EuroHockey Indoor Club Cup in  Alanya

Figure skating

ISU Figure Skating Championships
 January 23–29: 2023 European Figure Skating Championships in  Espoo
 Men's Singles winner:  Adam Siao Him Fa
 Ladies' Singles winner:  Anastasia Gubanova
 Pairs winners:  (Sara Conti & Niccolò Macii)
 Ice Dance winners:  (Charlène Guignard & Marco Fabbri)
 February 7–12: 2023 Four Continents Figure Skating Championships in  Colorado Springs
 February 27 – March 5: 2023 World Junior Figure Skating Championships in  Calgary
 March 20–26: 2023 World Figure Skating Championships in  Saitama

2022–23 ISU Grand Prix of Figure Skating
 October 21–23: 2022 Skate America in  Norwood
 Men's Singles winner:  Ilia Malinin
 Ladies' Singles winner:  Kaori Sakamoto
 Pairs winners:  (Alexa Knierim & Brandon Frazier)
 Ice Dance winners:  (Madison Chock & Evan Bates)
 October 28–30: 2022 Skate Canada International in  Mississauga
 Men's Singles winner:  Shoma Uno
 Ladies' Singles winner:  Rinka Watanabe
 Pairs winners:  (Riku Miura & Ryuichi Kihara)
 Ice Dance winners:  (Piper Gilles & Paul Poirier)
 November 4–6: 2022 Grand Prix de France in  Angers
 Men's Singles winner:  Adam Siao Him Fa
 Ladies' Singles winner:  Olga Mikutina
 Pairs winners:  (Deanna Stellato & Maxime Deschamps)
 Ice Dance winners:  (Charlène Guignard & Marco Fabbri)
 November 11–13: 2022 MK John Wilson Trophy in  Sheffield
 Men's Singles winner:  Daniel Grassl
 Ladies' Singles winner:  Mai Mihara
 Pairs winners:  (Alexa Knierim & Brandon Frazier)
 Ice Dance winners:  (Charlène Guignard & Marco Fabbri)
 November 18–20: 2022 NHK Trophy in  Sapporo
 Men's Singles winner:  Shoma Uno
 Ladies' Singles winner:  Kim Ye-lim
 Pairs winners:  (Riku Miura & Ryuichi Kihara)
 Ice Dance winners:  (Laurence Fournier Beaudry & Nikolaj Sørensen)
 November 25–27: 2022 Grand Prix of Espoo in  Espoo
 Men's Singles winner:  Ilia Malinin
 Ladies' Singles winner:  Mai Mihara
 Pairs winners:  (Rebecca Ghilardi & Filippo Ambrosini)
 Ice Dance winners:  (Piper Gilles & Paul Poirier)
 December 8–11: 2022–23 Grand Prix of Figure Skating Final in  Torino
 Senior Men's Singles winner:  Shoma Uno
 Senior Ladies' Singles winner:  Mai Mihara
 Senior Pairs winners:  (Riku Miura & Ryuichi Kihara)
 Senior Ice Dance winners:  (Piper Gilles & Paul Poirier)
 Junior Men's Singles winner:  Nikolaj Memola
 Junior Ladies' Singles winner:  Mao Shimada
 Junior Pairs winners:  (Anastasia Golubeva & Hektor Giotopoulos Moore)
 Junior Ice Dance winners:  (Nadiia Bashynska & Peter Beaumont)

2022–23 ISU Junior Grand Prix
 August 24–27: ISU Junior Grand Prix in France in  Courchevel
 Men's Singles winner:  Shunsuke Nakamura
 Ladies' Singles winner:  Hana Yoshida
 Ice Dance winners:  (Hannah Lim & Ye Quan)
 August 31 – September 3: ISU Junior Grand Prix in the Czech Republic in  Ostrava
 Men's Singles winner:  Nozomu Yoshioka
 Ladies' Singles winner:  Mao Shimada
 Pairs winners:  (Sophia Baram & Daniel Tioumentsev)
 Ice Dance winners:  (Kateřina Mrázková & Daniel Mrázek)
 September 7–10: ISU Junior Grand Prix in Latvia in  Riga
 Men's Singles winner:  Nikolaj Memola
 Ladies' Singles winner:  Shin Ji-a
 Pairs winners:  (Cayla Smith & Andy Deng)
 Ice Dance winners:  (Darya Grimm & Michail Savitskiy)
 September 21–24: ISU Junior Grand Prix in Armenia in  Yerevan
 Event cancelled.
 September 28 – October 1: ISU Junior Grand Prix in Poland in  Gdańsk #1
 Men's Singles winner:  Lucas Broussard
 Ladies' Singles winner:  Mao Shimada
 Pairs winners:  (Anastasia Golubeva & Hektor Giotopoulos Moore)
 Ice Dance winners:  (Nadiia Bashynska & Peter Beaumont)
 October 5–8: ISU Junior Grand Prix in Poland in  Gdańsk #2
 Men's Singles winner:  Takeru Amine Kataise
 Ladies' Singles winner:  Ami Nakai
 Pairs winners:  (Anastasia Golubeva & Hektor Giotopoulos Moore)
 Ice Dance winners:  (Nadiia Bashynska & Peter Beaumont)
 October 12–15: ISU Junior Grand Prix in Italy in  Egna
 Men's Singles winner:  Lucas Broussard
 Ladies' Singles winner:  Hana Yoshida
 Ice Dance winners:  (Kateřina Mrázková & Daniel Mrázek)

Fistball

International Fistball Association (IFA) 
 July 22–29: 2023 Fistball World Championships in  Mannheim

European Fistball Association (EFA) 
 January 7 & 8: EFA 2023 Fistball U19 European Championship in 
 Men's:  ;  ;  
 Women's:  ;  ;  
 January 21 & 22: EFA 2023 Fistball Men's Champions Cup Indoor in  Oberentfelden
 Winners:  TSV Pfungstadt, 2nd place:  TSV Hagen 1860, 3rd place:  STV Oberentfelden
 January 21 & 22: EFA 2023 Fistball Women's Champions Cup Indoor in  Nußbach
 Winners:  TSV Dennach, 2nd place:  SVD Diepoldsau-Schmitter, 3rd place:  TV Jahn Schneverdingen
 July 8 & 9: EFA 2023 Fistball U18 European Championship in

Floorball

 January 7–8: Champions Cup
 Men's champion:  IBF Falun
 Women's champion:  Team Thorengruppen
 April 26 – 30: 2023 Men's under-19 World Floorball Championships in  Frederikshavn
 December 2–10: 2023 Women's World Floorball Championships in  Singapore City

Freestyle skiing

Freestyle Skiing World Championships
 February 19 – March 4: FIS Freestyle Ski and Snowboarding World Championships 2023 in  Bakuriani
 March 20–26: 2023 FIS Junior Freestyle Moguls and Aerials World Ski Championship in  Airolo
 March 27 & 28: 2023 FIS Junior Freestyle Ski Cross World Ski Championship in  San Pellegrino Pass
 August 27 – September 8: 2023 FIS Junior Freeski World Championship in  Cardrona

Freeskiing World Cup
 October 21, 2022: FS World Cup #1 in  Chur
 Big Air winners:  Birk Ruud (m) /  Tess Ledeux (f)
 November 18 & 19, 2022: FS World Cup #2 in  Stubai
 Slopestyle winners:  Birk Ruud (m) /  Johanne Killi (f)
 November 24 & 25, 2022: FS World Cup #3 in  Falun
 Both Freeskiing Big Air events are cancelled.
 December 14–17, 2022: FS World Cup #4 in  Copper Mountain
 Big Air winners:  Birk Ruud (m) /  Megan Oldham (f)
 Halfpipe winners:  Birk Irving (m) /  Rachael Karker (f)
 January 12–14: FS World Cup #5 in  Font Romeu
 Both Freeskiing Slopestyle events are cancelled.
 January 18–22: FS World Cup #6 in  Laax
 Slopestyle winners:  Andri Ragettli (m) /  Johanne Killi (f)
 January 19–21: FS World Cup #7 in  Calgary
 Men's Halfpipe winners:  Jon Sallinen (#1) /  Alex Ferreira (#2)
 Women's Halfpipe winner:  Eileen Gu (2 times)
 February 1–4: FS World Cup #8 in  Mammoth Mountain
 Halfpipe winners: (m) / (f)
 Slopestyle winners: (m) / (f)
 March 9–11: FS World Cup #9 in  Secret Garden
 Both Freeskiing Halfpipe events are cancelled.
 March 16–18: FS World Cup #10 in  Tignes
 March 23–25: FS World Cup #11 (final) in  Silvaplana

Moguls & Aerials World Cup
 December 3 & 4, 2022: MA World Cup #1 in  Rukatunturi
 Aerials winners:  Pirmin Werner (m) /  Danielle Scott (f)
 Moguls winners:  Mikaël Kingsbury (m) /  Jakara Anthony (f)
 December 10 & 11, 2022: MA World Cup #2 in  Idre Fjäll
 Moguls winners:  Nick Page (m) /  Jakara Anthony (f)
 Dual Moguls winners:  Mikaël Kingsbury (m) /  Elizabeth Lemley (f)
 December 16 & 17, 2022: MA World Cup #3 in  Alpe d'Huez
 Men's Moguls & Dual Moguls winner:  Ikuma Horishima
 Women's Moguls winner:  Jakara Anthony
 Women's Dual Moguls winner:  Anri Kawamura
 January 21 & 22: MA World Cup #4 in  Le Relais
 Men's Aerials winners:  Quinn Dehlinger (#1) /  Noé Roth (#2)
 Women's Aerials winners:  Marion Thénault (#1) /  Laura Peel (#2)
 January 27 & 28: MA World Cup #5 in  Val Saint-Côme
 Moguls winners:  Mikaël Kingsbury (m) /  Anri Kawamura (f)
 Dual Moguls winners:  Walter Wallberg (m) /  Anri Kawamura (f)
 February 2–4: MA World Cup #6 in  Deer Valley
 Aerials winners: (m) / (f)
 Moguls winners: (m) / (f)
 Dual Moguls winners: (m) / (f)
 February 11: MA World Cup #7 in  Chiesa in Valmalenco
 Dual Moguls winners: (m) / (f)
 March 5: MA World Cup #8 in  Engadin
 March 17–20: MA World Cup #9 (final) in  Almaty

Ski cross World Cup
 November 4 & 5, 2022: SC World Cup #1 in  Les Deux Alpes
 Both Ski Cross events were cancelled.
 December 7–9, 2022: SC World Cup #2 in  Val Thorens
 Men's Ski Cross winners:  Johannes Rohrweck (#1) /  Mathias Graf (#2)
 Women's Ski Cross winner:  Sandra Näslund (2 times)
 December 11 & 12, 2022: SC World Cup #3 in  Arosa
 Ski Cross winners:  Terence Tchiknavorian (m) /  Sandra Näslund (f)
 December 20–22, 2022: SC World Cup #4 in  Innichen
 Men's Ski Cross winners:  Mathias Graf (#1) /  Reece Howden (#2)
 Women's Ski Cross winner:  Sandra Näslund (2 times)
 December 27–29, 2022: SC World Cup #5 in  Alleghe
 All Ski Cross events were cancelled.
 January 20–22: SC World Cup #6 in  Idre Fjäll
 Men's Ski Cross winners:  David Mobärg (#1) /  Reece Howden (#2)
 Women's Ski Cross winner:  Sandra Näslund (2 times)
 January 27–29: SC World Cup #7 in  Megève
 All Ski Cross events were cancelled.
 February 15–17: SC World Cup #8 in  Reiteralm
 Men's Ski Cross winners: (#1) / (#2)
 Women's Ski Cross winners: (#1) / (#2)
 March 3–5: SC World Cup #9 in  Oberwiesenthal
 March 10–12: SC World Cup #10 in  Veysonnaz
 March 17–19: SC World Cup #11 (final) in  Craigleith

European Cup
 November 20, 2022: EC #1 in  Pitztal
 Ski Cross winners:  Mathias Graf (m) /  Daniela Maier (f)

Australia/New Zealand Cup
 August 1–5, 2022: ANC #1 in  Perisher Ski Resort
 Freeski Slopestyle #1 winners:  Cameron Waddell (m) /  Mabel Ashburn (f)
 Freeski Slopestyle #2 winners:  Bailey Johnson (m) /  Mabel Ashburn (f)
 Freeski Big Air winners:  Cameron Waddell (m) /  Daisy Thomas (f)
 August 30 & 31, 2022: ANC #2 in  Perisher Ski Resort
 Moguls #1 winners:  Matt Graham (m) /  Anri Kawamura (f)
 Moguls #2 winners:  Matt Graham (m) /  Anri Kawamura (f)
 August 31 – September 3, 2022: ANC #3 in  Mount Hotham
 Ski Cross #1 winners:  Satoshi Furuno (m) /  Abby Evans (f)
 Ski Cross #2 winners:  Satoshi Furuno (m) /  Lin Nakanishi (f)
 Ski Cross #3 winners:  Douglas Crawford (m) /  Lin Nakanishi (f)
 September 1–4, 2022: ANC #3 in  Cardrona
 Freeski Halfpipe winners:  Gustav Legnavsky (m) /  Hanna Faulhaber (f)
 Freeski Slopestyle winners:  Luca Harrington (m) /  Ruby Andrews (f)
 September 2 & 3, 2022: ANC #4 in  Mount Buller
 Dual Moguls winners:  Matt Graham (m) /  Avital Carroll (f)
 October 1–8, 2022: ANC #4 in  Cardrona
 Freeski Big Air winners:  Luca Harrington (m) /  Daisy Thomas (f)
 Freeski Slopestyle winners:  Luca Harrington (m) /  Caoimhe Heavey (f)
 Freeski Halfpipe winners:  Gustav Legnavsky (m) /  Sylvia Trotter (f)

Freestyle Skiing South American Cup
 August 4–7, 2022: SAC #1 in  La Parva
 Freeski Slopestyle #1 winners:  Francisco Salas (m) /  Dominique Ohaco (f)
 Freeski Slopestyle #2 winners:  Cristóbal Colombo (m) /  Dominique Ohaco (f)
 August 8 & 9, 2022: SAC #2 in  El Colorado
 Freeski Big Air #1 winners:  Francisco Salas (m) /  Dominique Ohaco (f)
 Freeski Big Air #2 winners:  Francisco Salas (m) / No events
 August 10–12, 2022: SAC #3 in  La Parva
 Cancelled.
 September 7–12, 2022: SAC #4 in  Cerro Catedral
 Men's Freeski Slopestyle winner:  Francisco Salas (2 times)
 Women's Freeski Slopestyle winner:  Dominique Ohaco (2 times)
 Men's Freeski Big Air winner:  Cristóbal Colombo (2 times)
 Here, Women's Freeski Big Air is cancelled.
 September 15–17, 2022: SAC #5 in  La Parva
 Men's Ski Cross winners:  Valentin Signe (1st) /  Kay Holscher (2nd)
 Women's Ski Cross winners:  Maria Jesus Bartel (2 times)
 September 19–23, 2022: SAC #7 in  Chapelco
 Men's Freeski Slopestyle winner:  Francisco Salas
 Here, Women's Freeski Slopestyle and Freeski Big Air competitions are cancelled.

Futsal

UEFA
 March 17–19: UEFA Women's Futsal Euro 2023 Finals in  Debrecen
 May 5–7: 2022–23 UEFA Futsal Champions League Finals in  Palma de Mallorca
 September 3–10: 2023 UEFA Under-19 Futsal Championship in  Poreč

CONMEBOL
 June 17–25: 2023 South American U-17 Futsal Championship in  Asunción
 TBA: 2023 Copa América de Futsal (location TBA)
 TBA: 2023 Copa Libertadores de Futsal (location TBA)

AFC

 TBA: 2023 AFC U-20 Futsal Asian Cup (location TBA)
 TBA: 2023 AFC Futsal Club Championship
 TBA: 2023 AFC Futsal Asian Cup  (location IRAN)

OFC
 TBA: 2023 OFC Futsal Cup (location TBA)

Flying disc

Goalball

Golf

 October 18–28: 2023 Eisenhower Trophy and 2023 Espirito Santo Trophy in

Men's major golf championships (PGA)
 April 3–9: 2023 Masters Tournament in  Augusta
 May 15–21: 2023 PGA Championship in  Rochester
 June 12–18: 2023 U.S. Open in  Los Angeles
 July 17–23: 2023 Open Championship in  Metropolitan Borough of Wirral

Women's major golf championships (LPGA)
 April 20–23: 2023 Chevron Championship at The Club at Carlton Woods in  The Woodlands
 June 22–25: 2023 Women's PGA Championship in  Springfield
 July 6–9: 2023 U.S. Women's Open in  Pebble Beach
 July 27–30: 2023 Evian Championship in  Évian-les-Bains
 August 10–13: 2023 Women's British Open in  Surrey

Senior major golf championships (PGA Tour Champions)
 May 8–14: The Tradition in  Birmingham
 May 22–28: Senior PGA Championship at  Fields Ranch East at PGA Frisco
 June 25 – July 2: U.S. Senior Open at SentryWorld in  Stevens Point
 July 10–16: Senior Players Championship in  Akron
 July 24–30: 2023 Senior Open Championship in  Porthcawl

Gymnastics

Gymnastics World Championships
 March 29 – April 2: 2023 Junior World Artistic Gymnastics Championships in  Antalya
 August 23–27: 2023 Rhythmic Gymnastics World Championships in  Valencia
 September 30 – October 8: 2023 Artistic Gymnastics World Championships in  Antwerp
 November 9–12: 2023 Trampoline Gymnastics World Championships in  Birmingham

2023 FIG Artistic Gymnastics World Cup series
 February 23–26: AG World Cup #1 in  Cottbus
 March 1–4: AG World Cup #2 in  Doha
 March 9–12: AG World Cup #3 in  Baku
 March 15–18: AG World Cup #4 (final) in  Cairo

2023 FIG Artistic Gymnastics World Challenge Cup series
 May 25–28: AGWCC #1 in  Varna
 June 1–4: AGWCC #2 in  Tel Aviv
 June 8–11: AGWCC #3 in  Osijek
 September 1–3: AGWCC #4 in  Mersin
 September 8–10: AGWCC #5 in  Szombathely
 September 16 & 17: AGWCC #6 (final) in  Paris

2023 FIG Rhythmic Gymnastics World Cup series
 March 17–19: RG World Cup #1 in  Athens
 March 24–26: RG World Cup #2 in  Pesaro
 March 31 – April 2: RG World Cup #3 in  Sofia
 April 14–16: RG World Cup #4 in  Tashkent
 April 21–23: RG World Cup #5 (final) in  Baku

2023 FIG Rhythmic Gymnastics World Challenge Cup series
 May 5–7: RGWCC #1 in  Portimão
 August 11–13: RGWCC #2 (final) in  Cluj-Napoca

Trampoline, Tumbling, & DMT World Cup
 February 18 & 19: TT World Cup #1 in  Baku
 July 1 & 2: TT World Cup #2 in  Santarém
 July 7 & 8: TT World Cup #3 in  Coimbra
 October 7 & 8: TT World Cup #4 (final) in  Varna

Handball

IHF Championships
11–29 January: 2023 World Men's Handball Championship in  Poland and  Sweden
30 November – 17 December: 2023 World Women's Handball Championship in  Denmark,  Norway and  Sweden

AHF

EHF

Club competitions

Horse racing

United States
May 6: Kentucky Derby at  Churchill Downs  
May 20: Preakness Stakes at  Pimlico
June 10: Belmont Stakes at  Belmont Park
November 3–4: Breeders Cup at  Santa Anita Park

Ice climbing

Ice hockey

Ice Hockey World Championships
 February 27 – March 5: 2023 IIHF World Championship Division III – Group B in  Sarajevo
 March 23–26: 2023 IIHF World Championship Division IV in  Ulaanbaatar
 April 15–21: 2023 IIHF World Championship Division II – Group A in  Madrid
 April 17–23: 2023 IIHF World Championship Division II – Group B in  Istanbul
 April 17–23: 2023 IIHF World Championship Division III – Group A in  Cape Town
 April 23–29: 2023 IIHF World Championship Division I – Group B in  Tallinn
 April 29 – May 5: 2023 IIHF World Championship Division I – Group A in  Nottingham
 May 12–28: 2023 IIHF World Championship in  Tampere &  Riga

IIHF World Junior Championship
 December 11–17, 2022: 2023 World Junior Ice Hockey Championships – Division I Group A in  Asker
  was promoted to the Top Division.  was relegated to Division I – Group B.
 December 11–17, 2022: 2023 World Junior Ice Hockey Championships – Division I Group B in  Bytom
  was promoted to Division I – Group A.  was relegated to Division II – Group A.
 December 11–17, 2022: 2023 World Junior Ice Hockey Championships – Division II Group A in  Kaunas
  was promoted to Division I – Group B.  was relegated to Division II – Group B.
 December 26, 2022 – January 5: 2023 World Junior Ice Hockey Championships in  Halifax & Moncton
 The  defeated , 8–7 in overtime, to win the bronze medal.
  was relegated to Division I – Group A.
 January 16–22: 2023 World Junior Ice Hockey Championships – Division II Group B in  Reykjavik
  was promoted to Division II – Group A.  was relegated to Division III.
 January 26 – February 2: 2023 World Junior Ice Hockey Championships – Division III in  Istanbul

IIHF World U18 Championship
 March 12–18: 2023 IIHF World U18 Championships – Division III Group A in  Reykjavík
 March 13–16: 2023 IIHF World U18 Championships – Division III Group B in  Cape Town
 March 27 – April 2: 2023 IIHF World U18 Championships – Division II Group B in  Sofia
 April 10–16: 2023 IIHF World U18 Championships – Division I Group B in  Bled
 April 16–22: 2023 IIHF World U18 Championships – Division II Group A in  Belgrade
 April 20–30: 2023 IIHF World U18 Championships in  Basel & Porrentruy
 April 23–29: 2023 IIHF World U18 Championships – Division I Group A in  Angers

IIHF World Women's Championship
 February 20–26: 2023 IIHF Women's World Championship Division II – Group B in  Cape Town
 March 27–30: 2023 IIHF Women's World Championship Division III – Group B in  Metula
 April 1–7: 2023 IIHF Women's World Championship Division II – Group A in  Mexico City
 April 3–9: 2023 IIHF Women's World Championship Division III – Group A in  Brașov
 April 5–16: 2023 IIHF Women's World Championship in  Brampton
 April 16–22: 2023 IIHF Women's World Championship Division I – Group A in  Shenzhen
 April 17–23: 2023 IIHF Women's World Championship Division I – Group B in  Suwon

IIHF World Women's U18 Championship
 January 8–15: 2023 IIHF World Women's U18 Championship in  Östersund
  defeated , 10–0, to win their second consecutive and seventh World Women's U18 Championship title.
 The  won the bronze medal.
  was relegated to Division I – Group A.
 January 9–15: 2023 IIHF World Women's U18 Championship Division I – Group A in  Ritten
  was promoted to Top Division.  was relegated to Division I – Group B.
 January 9–15: 2023 IIHF World Women's U18 Championship Division I – Group B in  Katowice
  was promoted to Division I – Group A.  was relegated to Division II – Group A.
 January 21–27: 2023 IIHF World Women's U18 Championship Division II – Group A in  Dumfries
  was promoted to Division I – Group B.  was relegated to Division II – Group B.
 January 26 – February 1: 2023 IIHF World Women's U18 Championship Division II – Group B in  Sofia

National Hockey League
 October 7, 2022 – April 13, 2023: 2022–23 NHL season
 January 2: 2023 NHL Winter Classic in  Boston
 The  Boston Bruins defeated the  Pittsburgh Penguins, 2–1.
 February 4: 2023 National Hockey League All-Star Game in  Sunrise
 February 18: 2023 NHL Stadium Series in  Raleigh
 The  Washington Capitals vs. the  Carolina Hurricanes
 June 28 & 29: 2023 NHL Entry Draft in  Nashville
 TBA: 2023 NHL Playoffs

Europe (IIHF)
 September 1, 2022 – February 18: 2022–23 Champions Hockey League
 September 23, 2022 – January 15: 2022–23 IIHF Continental Cup
   HK Nitra;   Ducs d'Angers;   Cardiff Devils
 November 10, 2022 – May 7: 2022–23 Euro Hockey Tour

Kontinental Hockey League
 September 1, 2022 – February 26: 2022–23 KHL season

Ice stock sport

Indoor soccer

Inline Hockey

Judo

World & Other championships
 May 7–14: 2023 World Judo Championships in  Doha
 August 23–27: 2023 World Judo Cadets Championships in  Zagreb
 August 29 & 30: 2024 Summer Olympics Test Event in  Paris
 October 4–8: 2023 World Judo Juniors Championships in  Coimbra

Continental championships
 July 1: 2023 European Mixed Team Judo Championships in  Kraków
 September 15–17: 2023 Pan American-Oceania Judo Championships in  Calgary
 November 3–5: 2023 European Judo Championships in  Montpellier

Judo Grand Slam
 February 4 & 5: JGS #1 in  Paris
 February 17–19: JGS #2 in  Tel Aviv
 March 3–5: JGS #3 in  Tashkent
 March 24–26: JGS #4 in  Tbilisi
 March 31 – April 2: JGS #5 in  Antalya
 June 23–25: JGS #6 in  Ulaanbaatar
 August 4–6: JGS #7 in  Budapest
 September 22–24: JGS #8 in  Baku
 October 20–22: JGS #9 in  Abu Dhabi
 December 2 & 3: JGS #10 (final) in  Tokyo

Judo Grand Prix
 January 27–29: JGP #1 in  Almada
Men
 60 kg winner:
 66 kg winner:
 73 kg winner:
 81 kg winner:
 90 kg winner:
 100 kg winner:
 +100 kg winner:

Women
 48 kg winner:
 52 kg winner:
 57 kg winner:
 63 kg winner:
 70 kg winner:
 78 kg winner:
 +78 kg winner:
 August 18–20: JGP #2 (final) in  Zagreb

Jujuysu

Karate

Various karate championships
 February 3–5: 2023 EKF Cadet, Junior & U21 Championships in  Larnaca
 March 22–26: 2023 European Karate Championships in  Guadalajara
 May 5–7: 2023 Mediterranean Karate Championships in  Tunis
 May 26–28: 2023 Pan American Karate Championships in  San José
 August 25–27: 2023 PKF Cadet, Junior & U21 Championships in  Santiago
 October 24–29: 2023 World Karate Championships in  Budapest
 TBA: 2023 African Karate Championships in  Accra
 TBA: 2023 Asian Karate Championships (location TBA)

Karate 1–Premier League
 January 27–29: K1PL #1 in  Cairo
 May 12–14: K1PL #2 in  Rabat
 June 9–11: K1PL #3 in  Fukuoka
 September 8–10: K1PL #4 (final) in  Dublin

Karate 1–Series A
 January 13–15: K1SA #1 in  Athens
 Men's Kumite:
 60 kg winner:  Hiromu Hashimoto
 67 kg winner:  Yugo Kozaki
 75 kg winner:  Abdelkarim Asaas
 84 kg winner:  Junya Eto
 +84 kg winner:  Anes Bostandžić
 Women's Kumite
 50 kg winner:  Catarina Rodrigues
 55 kg winner:  Syria Mancinelli
 61 kg winner:  Konstantina Chrysopoulou
 68 kg winner:  Tsubasa Kama
 +68 kg winner:  Kyriaki Kydonaki
 Kata
 Individual Kata winners:  Aoi Funada (m) /  Mirisa Ohuchi (f)
 Team Kata winners:  (m) /  (f)
 April 14–16: K1SA #3 in  Richmond
 September 29 – October 1: K1SA #4 in  Larnaca
 November 24–26: K1SA #5 (final) in  Matosinhos

Karate 1–Youth League
 February 24–26: K1YL #1 in  Fujairah
 April 28–30: K1YL #2 in  A Coruña
 June 30 – July 2: K1YL #3 in  Poreč
 December 8–10: K1YL #5 (final) in  Venice

Kendo

Kickboxing

Korfball

Kurash

Lacrosse

Lifesaving

Luge

World & Continental Luge Championships
 December 16 & 17, 2022: 2022 FIL Junior European Luge Championships in  Altenberg
 Junior Singles winners:  Kaspars Rinks (m) /  Antonia Pietschmann (f)
 Men's Junior Doubles winners:  (Kaspars Rinks & Vitalijs Jegorovs)
 Women's Junior Doubles winners:  (Lisa Zimmermann & Dorothea Schwartz)
 Junior Team winners:  (Antonia Pietschmann, Marco Leger, & Moritz Jäger and Valentin Steudte)
 December 16 & 17, 2022: 2022 FIL America-Pacific Luge Championship in  Park City
 Singles winners:  Tucker West (m) /  Emily Sweeney (f)
 Men's Doubles winners:  (Zack DiGregorio & Sean Hollander)
 Women's Doubles winners:  (Caitlin Nash & Natalie Corless)
 December 17, 2022: 2022 FIL Asian Luge Championships in  PyeongChang
 Individual winners:  Kobayashi Seiya (m) /  WANG Jiaxue (f)
 January 14 & 15: 2023 FIL European Luge Championships in  Sigulda
 Singles winners:  Max Langenhan (m) /  Anna Berreiter
 Men's Doubles winners:  (Tobias Wendl & Tobias Arlt)
 Women's Doubles winners:  (Andrea Vötter & Marion Oberhofer)
 Team Relay winners:  (Elīna Ieva Vītola, Kristers Aparjods, & Mārtiņš Bots and Roberts Plūme)
 U23 Singles winners:  Gints Bērziņš (m) /  Elīna Ieva Vītola (f)
 U23 Men's Doubles winners:  (Eduards Ševics-Mikeļševics & Lūkass Krasts)
 U23 Women's Doubles winners:  (Anda Upīte & Sanita Ozoliņa)
 January 14 & 15: 2023 FIL World Junior Championships in  Bludenz
 Junior Singles winners:  Kaspars Rinkns (m) /  Yulianna Tunytska (f)
 Junior Men's Doubles winners:  (Kaspars Rinkns & Vitālijs Jegorovs)
 Junior Women's Doubles winners:  (Viktorija Ziediņa & Selīna Zvilna)
 Junior Team winners:  (Anka Jänicke, Marco Leger, & Moritz Jäger and Valentin Steudte)
 January 28 & 29: 2023 FIL World Luge Championships in  Oberhof

Luge World Cup
 December 3 & 4, 2022: World Cup #1 in  Innsbruck
 Singles winners:  Nico Gleirscher (m) /  Madeleine Egle (f)
 Men's Doubles winners:  (Juri Thomas Gatt & Riccardo Martin Schöpf)
 Women's Doubles winners:  (Selina Egle & Lara Michaela Kipp)
 December 9 & 10, 2022: World Cup #2 in  Whistler
 Singles winners:  Felix Loch (m) /  Madeleine Egle (f)
 Men's Doubles winners:  (Toni Eggert & Sascha Benecken)
 Women's Doubles winners:  (Andrea Vötter & Marion Oberhofer)
 Relay winners:  (Julia Taubitz, Felix Loch, Toni Eggert & Sascha Benecken)
 December 16 & 17, 2022: World Cup #3 in  Park City
 Singles winners:  Dominik Fischnaller (m) /  Dajana Eitberger (f)
 Men's Doubles winners:  (Toni Eggert & Sascha Benecken)
 Women's Doubles winners:  (Andrea Vötter & Marion Oberhofer)
 Women's Sprint winner:  Julia Taubitz
 Men's Sprint Doubles winners:  (Tobias Wendl & Tobias Arlt)
 Women's Sprint Doubles winners:  (Selina Egle & Lara Michaela Kipp)
 January 7 & 8: World Cup #4 in  Sigulda
 Singles winners:  Kristers Aparjods (m) /  Dajana Eitberger (f)
 Men's Doubles winners:  (Mārtiņš Bots & Roberts Plūme)
 Women's Doubles winners:  (Anda Upite & Sanija Ozoliņa)
 Relay winners:  (Elīna Ieva Vītola, Kristers Aparjods, Mārtiņš Bots & Roberts Plūme)
 February 4 & 5: World Cup #5 in  Altenberg
 February 11 & 12: World Cup #6 in  Winterberg #1
 February 18 & 19: World Cup #7 in  St. Moritz-Celerina
 February 25 & 26: World Cup #8 (final) in  Winterberg #2

Minigolf

Modern pentathlon

World & Continental Championships
 June 14–18: 2023 European Junior Modern Pentathlon Championships in  Istanbul
 August 21–28: 2023 World Modern Pentathlon Championships in  Bath
 September 6–11: 2023 African & Oceania Modern Pentathlon Championships in  Cairo
 September 12–17: 2023 World Junior Modern Pentathlon Championships in  Druskininkai
 November 9–12: 2023 South & Pan American Junior Modern Pentathlon Championships in  Buenos Aires

Modern Pentathlon World Cup
 March 7–12: MPWC #1 in  Cairo
 April 11–16: MPWC #2 in  Ankara #1
 April 25–30: MPWC #3 in  Budapest
 May 9–14: MPWC #4 in  Sofia
 May 31 – June 4: MPWC #5 (final) in  Ankara #2

Motorsports

2023 Formula One World Championship
 March 5: 2023 Bahrain Grand Prix in  Sakhir
 Winner: Max Verstappen  (Oracle Red Bull Racing)
 March 19: 2023 Saudi Arabian Grand Prix in  Jeddah
 April 2: 2023 Australian Grand Prix in  Melbourne
 April 16: 2023 Chinese Grand Prix in  Shanghai
 April 30: 2023 Azerbaijan Grand Prix in  Baku
 May 7: 2023 Miami Grand Prix in  Miami Gardens, Florida
 May 21: 2023 Emilia Romagna Grand Prix in  Imola
 May 28: 2023 Monaco Grand Prix in  Monte Carlo
 June 4: 2023 Spanish Grand Prix in  Barcelona
 June 18: 2023 Canadian Grand Prix in  Montreal
 July 2: 2023 Austrian Grand Prix in  Spielberg, Styria
 July 9: 2023 British Grand Prix in  Silverstone
 July 23: 2023 Hungarian Grand Prix in  Budapest
 July 30: 2023 Belgian Grand Prix in  Stavelot
 August 27: 2023 Dutch Grand Prix in  Zandvoort
 September 3: 2023 Italian Grand Prix in  Monza
 September 17: 2023 Singapore Grand Prix in  Marina Bay, Singapore
 September 24: 2023 Japanese Grand Prix in  Suzuka, Mie
 October 8: 2023 Qatar Grand Prix in  Lusail
 October 22: 2023 United States Grand Prix in  Austin, Texas
 October 29: 2023 Mexico City Grand Prix in  Mexico City
 November 5: 2023 São Paulo Grand Prix in  São Paulo
 November 18: 2023 Las Vegas Grand Prix in  Las Vegas (debut event)
 November 26: 2023 Abu Dhabi Grand Prix (final) in  Yas Island

2022–23 Formula E World Championship
 January 14: 2023 Mexico City ePrix in  Mexico
 Winner:  Jake Dennis ( Andretti Autosport)
 January 27 & 28: 2023 Diriyah ePrix at the  Riyadh Street Circuit (2 times)
 March 25: 2023 São Paulo ePrix in  Brazil
 April 22 & 23: 2023 Berlin ePrix at the  Tempelhof Airport Street Circuit (2 times)
 May 6: 2023 Monaco ePrix in  Monte Carlo
 June 3 & 4: 2023 Jakarta ePrix in  Ancol (2 times)
 June 24: 2023 Portland ePrix in  Portland International Raceway (debut event)
 July 15 & 16: 2023 Rome ePrix in  Italy (2 times)
 July 29 & 30: 2023 London ePrix (final) at the  ExCeL London Circuit (2 times)

2023 World Rally Championship
 January 19–22:  2023 Monte Carlo Rally
 WRC:  Sébastien Ogier ( Toyota Gazoo Racing WRT)
 WRC-2:  Yohan Rossel ( PH Sport)

2023 World Rally-Raid Championship
 December 31, 2022 – January 15:  2023 Dakar Rally
 Bikes:  Kevin Benavides (Red Bull KTM Factory Racing)
 Cars:  Nasser Al-Attiyah (Toyota Gazoo Racing)
 Classics:  Juan Morera (Toyota Classic)
 LW-Prototype:  Austin Jones (Red Bull Off-Road JR Team USA By BFG)
 Quads:  Alexandre Giroud (Yamaha Racing- SMX Drag'on)
 SSV:  Eryk Goczał (Energylandia Rally Team)
 Trucks:  Janus van Kasteren (Boss Machinery Team De Rooy Iveco)
 February 26 – March 3:  2023 Abu Dhabi Desert Challenge
 April 22–28:  2023 Sonora Rally
 August 26 – September 1:  2023 Desafío Ruta 40
 October 12–18:  2023 Rallye du Maroc (final)

NASCAR
 February 5 – November 5: 2023 NASCAR Cup Series
 February 17 – November 3: 2023 NASCAR Craftsman Truck Series
 February 18 – November 4: 2023 NASCAR Xfinity Series

IndyCar Series
 March 5 – September 10: 2023 IndyCar Series

Mountain running

Muay Thai

Netball

Nordic combined

Nordic Combined World Championships
 January 27 – February 5: 2023 Nordic Junior World Ski Championships in  Whistler
 February 22 – March 5: FIS Nordic World Ski Championships 2023 in  Planica

NC World Cup
 November 24–27, 2022: World Cup #1 in  Rukatunturi
 Men's Gundersen Large Hill winners:  Julian Schmid (#1) /  Jarl Magnus Riiber (#2)
 Men's Mass Start Large Hill winner:  Jarl Magnus Riiber
 December 1–4, 2022: World Cup #2 in  Lillehammer
 Men's Gundersen Large Hill winner:  Jarl Magnus Riiber
 Men's Gundersen Normal Hill winner:  Jens Lurås Oftebro
 Women's Gundersen Normal Hill winner:  Gyda Westvold Hansen (2 times)
 December 15–18, 2022: World Cup #3 in  Ramsau am Dachstein
 Men's Gundersen Normal Hill winners:  Jarl Magnus Riiber (#1) /  Vinzenz Geiger (#2)
 Women's Gundersen Normal Hill winner:  Gyda Westvold Hansen (2 times)
 January 5–8: World Cup #4 in  Otepää
 The Women's Mass Start event was cancelled.
 Men's Gundersen Normal Hill winner:  Julian Schmid
 Women's Gundersen Normal Hill winner:  Gyda Westvold Hansen
 Men's Mass Start winner:  Johannes Lamparter
 Team winners:  (Jens Lurås Oftebro, Ida Marie Hagen, Gyda Westvold Hansen, & Jørgen Graabak)
 January 19–22: World Cup #5 in  Klingenthal
 Men's Gundersen & Mass Start Large Hill winner:  Johannes Lamparter
 January 20–22: World Cup #6 in  Chaux-Neuve
 Both Men's Gundersen Large Hill events was cancelled.
 January 26–29: World Cup #7 in  Seefeld in Tirol
 Men's Gundersen Normal Hill winners: (#1) / (#2) / (#3)
 Women's Gundersen Normal Hill winners: (#1) / (#2)
 February 3–5: World Cup #8 in  Oberstdorf
 February 10–12: World Cup #9 in  Schonach im Schwarzwald
 March 8–12: World Cup #10 in  Oslo
 March 24–27: World Cup #11 (final) in  Lahti

2022 FIS Nordic combined Grand Prix
 August 26–28, 2022: GP #1 in  Oberwiesenthal
 Winners:  Ilkka Herola (m) /  Ema Volavšek (f)
 Team event winners:  I (Julian Schmid, Jenny Nowak, Nathalie Armbruster, Johannes Rydzek)
 August 30 & 31, 2022: GP #2 in  Oberstdorf
 Winners:  Franz-Josef Rehrl (m) /  Gyda Westvold Hansen (f)
 September 2–4, 2022: GP #3 in  Tschagguns
 Men's winners:  Jens Lurås Oftebro (1st) /  Eero Hirvonen (2nd)
 Women's winners:  Nathalie Armbruster (1st) /  Gyda Westvold Hansen (2nd)

2022–23 Alpen Cup
 August 8, 2022: OPA #1 in  Klingenthal (Women's only)
 Winner:  Anne Häckel
 August 12 & 13, 2022: OPA #2 in  Bischofsgrün (Women's only)
 Cancelled.
 September 9 & 10, 2022: OPA #3 in  Oberstdorf (Men's only)
 Winner:  Marco Heinis (2 times)
 September 17 & 18, 2022: OPA #4 in  Schwäbisch Gmünd (Women's only)
 Winners:  Magdalena Burger (1st) /  Thea Haeckel (2nd)
 September 24 & 25, 2022: OPA #5 in  Villach
 Men's winner:  Marco Heinis (2 times)
 Women's winner:  Anne Häckel (2 times)
 October 8 & 9, 2022: OPA #6 in  Gérardmer
 Men's winner:  Marceau Liardon
 Women's winner:  Katharina Gruber
 Men's Team winners:  (Levi Hofmann, Moritz Krismayr, Kenji Grossegger)
 Women's Team winners:  I (Mara-Jolie Schlossarek, Pia Loh, Fabienne Klumpp)

2022–23 FIS Youth Cup
 September 2 & 3, 2022: YC1 & YC2 in  Tschagguns
 YC1 #1 winners:  Lovro Serucnik Percl (m) /  Emilia Vidgren (f)
 YC2 #1 winners:  Jan John (m) /  Kjersti Græsli (f)
 YC1 #2 winners:  Kenji Grossegger (m) /  Anna-Sophia Gredler (f)
 YC2 #2 winners:  Jan John (m) /  Ingrid Laate (f)

Orienteering

Racquetball

2022–23 International Racquetball Tour 
Grand Slam
 September 28 – October 2, 2022: US Open Racquetball Championships in  Minneapolis
 Singles:  Conrrado Moscoso defeated  Rodrigo Montoya, 15–8, 15–4.
 Doubles:  Álvaro Beltrán &  Daniel de la Rosa defeated  Sam Bredenbeck &  Jake Bredenbeck, 14–15, 15–10, 11–4.

Tier 1
 September 15–18, 2022: Capitol Classic Racquetball Tournament in  Millersville
 Singles:  Eduardo Portillo Torres defeated  Javier Mar, 15–7, 15–3.
 October 6–9, 2022: Golden State Open 2022 in  Pleasanton
 Singles:  Conrrado Moscoso defeated  Jake Bredenbeck, 15–11, 15–7.
 November 3–6, 2022: Dovetail Open in  Sarasota
 Singles:  Daniel de la Rosa defeated  Rodrigo Montoya, 15–5, 15–3.
 December 1–4, 2022: Tournament of Champions 2022 in  Portland
 Singles:  Jake Bredenbeck defeated  Eduardo Portillo Torres, 15–14, 8–15, 11–7.
 January 6–8: 2023 Longhorn Open in  Austin
 January 19–22: Lewis Drug Pro-Am in  Sioux Falls
 February 16–19: Suivant Consulting Pro-Am	in  Lilburn
 March 1–3: Minnesota Hall of Fame	in  Fridley
 March 16–19: Papa Nicholas Shootout in  Lombard
 April 20–23: SoCal Open in  Fullerton
 April 27–30: Baja California Open	in  Tijuana

Satellite
 November 16–19, 2022: Monterrey International Open in  Monterrey
 Singles:  Andree Parrilla defeated  Jordy Alonso, 15–6, 15–5.

Outdoor
 October 26 – November 4, 2022: 3WallBall Outdoor World Championships in  Las Vegas
 Singles:  Conrrado Moscoso defeated  Andrés Acuña, 15–11, 14–15, 11–4.
 Doubles:  Eduardo Portillo Torres &  Rocky Carson defeated  Adam Manilla &  Nicholas Riffel, 15–8, 15–3.
 Mixed doubles:  Daniel de la Rosa &  Michelle de La Rosa defeated  Mario Mercado &  Brenda Laime, 12–15, 15–14, 11–3.

2022–23 Ladies Professional Racquetball Tour 
Grand Slam
 August 12–17, 2022: Paola Longoria Experience in  Aguascalientes
 Singles:  Paola Longoria defeated  Montserrat Mejía, 15–12, 11–15, 11–10.
 Doubles:  Alexandra Herrera &  Montserrat Mejía defeated  Samantha Salas &  Paola Longoria, 15–7, 15–7.
 September 28 – October 2, 2022: US Open Racquetball Championships in  Minneapolis
 Singles:  Paola Longoria defeated  Erika Manilla, 13–15, 15–5, 11–3.
 Doubles:  Erika Manilla &  Natalia Méndez defeated  Samantha Salas &  Paola Longoria, 15–14, 7–15, 11–4.

Tier 1
 September 8 – October 1, 2022: LPRT at the Beach in  Chesapeake
 Singles:  Alexandra Herrera defeated  Brenda Laime, 15–7, 15–12.
 Doubles:  Hollie Scott &  Kelani Lawrence defeated  Paola Longoria &  Valeria Centellas, 15–1, 15–12.
 November 18–22, 2022: LPRT Pro Am Turkey Shoot in  Chicago
 Singles:  Montserrat Mejía defeated  Alexandra Herrera, 2–15, 15–12, 11–5.
 Doubles:  Alexandra Herrera &  Samantha Salas defeated  Erika Manilla &  Natalia Méndez, 15–13, 15–14.
 December 9–11, 2022: 30th Annual Christmas Classic in  Severna Park
 Singles:  Montserrat Mejía defeated  Paola Longoria, 15–8, 15–7.
 Doubles:  Samantha Salas &  Alexandra Herrera defeated  Montserrat Mejía &  Paola Longoria, 15–0, 13–15, 11–7.
 February 16–18: RPAA Presents 2023 Arizona State Doubles with LPRT Pro Stop in  Tempe
 March 3–5: The Boston Open in  Boston
 April 27–29: Battle at the Alamo in  San Antonio

Outdoor
 October 26 – November 4, 2022: 3WallBall Outdoor World Championships in  Las Vegas
 Singles:  Carla Muñoz defeated  Janel Tisinger-Ledkins, 12–15, 15–10, 11–8.
 Doubles:  Michelle de La Rosa &  Janel Tisinger-Ledkins defeated  Brenda Laime &  Alexandra Herrera, 15–2, 15–11.
 Mixed doubles:  Daniel de la Rosa &  Michelle de La Rosa defeated  Mario Mercado &  Brenda Laime, 12–15, 15–14, 11–3.
 March 10–12: Beach Bash in  Hollywood

Roller skating

Rowing

World & Continental Championships
 January 28 & 29: 2023 European Rowing Indoor Championships in  Paris
 February 25 & 26: 2023 World Rowing Indoor Championships in  Toronto
 May 20 & 21: 2023 European Rowing Under 19 Championships in  Brive-la-Gaillarde
 May 25–28: 2023 European Rowing Championships in  Bled
 July 13–15: 2023 World University Rowing Championships in  London
 July 19–23: 2023 World Rowing U23 Championships in  Plovdiv
 August 2–6: 2023 World Rowing Junior Championships in  Paris
 August 26 & 27: 2023 European Rowing U23 Championships in  Krefeld
 September 3–10: 2023 World Rowing Championships in  Belgrade

2023 World Rowing Cup
 May 5–7: WRC #1 in  Zagreb
 June 16–18: WRC #2 in  Varese
 July 7–9: WRC #3 (final) in  Lucerne

Rugby union

Rugby World Cup
 September 8 – October 28: 2023 Rugby World Cup in

2022–23 World Rugby Sevens Series
 November 4–6, 2022: WRSS #1 in  Hong Kong Stadium #1 (Men only)
  defeated , 20–17, in the final.  took third place.
 December 2 & 3, 2022: WRSS #2 in  Dubai (Men & Women)
 Men:  defeated , 21–5, in the final.  took third place.
 Women:  defeated , 26–19, in the final. The  took third place.
 December 9–11, 2022: WRSS #3 in  Cape Town (Men & Women)
 Men:  defeated , 12–7, in the final. The  took third place.
 Women:  defeated , 31–14, in the final. The  took third place.
 January 21 & 22: WRSS #4 in  Hamilton (Men & Women)
 Men:  defeated , 14–12, in the final. The  took third place.
 January 27–29: WRSS #5 in  Sydney (Men & Women)
 February 25 & 26: WRSS #6 in  Los Angeles (Men only)
 March 3–5: WRSS #7 in  Vancouver (Men & Women)
 March 31 – April 2: WRSS #8 in  Hong Kong Stadium #2 (Men & Women)
 April 8 & 9: WRSS #9 in  Singapore (Men only)
 May 12–14: WRSS #10 in  Toulouse (Men & Women's Final)
 May 20 & 21: WRSS #11 in  London (Men's Final)

2023 Six Nations Championship
 February 4 & 5: Round 1
  vs.  at Millennium Stadium
  vs.  at Twickenham Stadium
  vs.  at Stadio Olimpico

2023 Women's Six Nations Championship
 March 25 & 26: Round 1
  vs.  at Cardiff Arms Park
  vs.  at Kingston Park
  vs.  at Stadio Sergio Lanfranchi

2023 Six Nations Under 20s Championship
 February 3: Week 1
  vs.  at Eirias Stadium
  vs.  at Twickenham Stoop
  vs.  at Stadio Comunale di Monigo

Sailing

Sailing World Championships
January
 December 29, 2022 – January 5: 2023 Cadet Class World Championship in  Melbourne
 Winner:  Toby Bush
 January 15–20: 2023 Contender World Championship in  Perth
 Winner:  Mark Bulka

February
 February 19–26: 2023 Nacra 15 World Championship in  Fort Lauderdale

March
 March 9–25: 2023 Flying Fifteen World Championship at Fremantle Sailing Club in  Perth
 March 24 & 25: 2023 Viper 640 Women's and Youth World Championships in  New Orleans
 March 27–31: 2023 Viper 640 World Championships in  New Orleans

April
 April 12–21: 2023 Etchells World Championship in  Miami

May
 May 22–28: 2023 KiteFoil Masters World Championships in  Torregrande
 May 26 – June 2: 2023 Finn World Master Championship in  Kavala
 May 29 – June 3: 2023 Dragon World Championship in  Bodrum

June
 June 11–21: 2023 Optimist World Championship at Club De Vela Ballena Alegre in  Sant Pere Pescador
 June 17–23: 2023 SB20 World Championship in  Scheveningen
 June 23–30: 2023 Ok Dinghy World Championship in  Lyme Regis

July
 July 4–14: 2023 B14 World Championship in  Torbole
 July 7–16: Paris 2024 Test Event – Sailing in  Marseille
 July 8–14: 2023 Europe Class World Championship in  Copenhagen
 July 11–15: 2023 Hobie Dragoon World Championship in  Cesenatico
 July 11–16: 2023 A's Youth Foil World Championship in  Gizzeria
 July 17–21: 2023 Hobie 14 World Championship in  Cesenatico
 July 17–23: 2023 Formula Kite Youth World Championships in  Cagliari
 July 21–30: 2023 J/22 & Formula 18 World Championship in  Travemünde
 July 22–28: 2023 Vaurien World Championship in  Le Havre
 July 22–30: 2023 Flying Dutchman World Championship in  Gdynia
 July 22–30: 2023 Mirror Class World Championship in  Rosses Point
 July 24–28: 2023 Topper World Championship in  Crosshaven
 July 27 – August 4: 2023 29er World Championship in  Isle of Portland
 July 28 – August 4: 2023 Dart 18 World Championship in  Bridlington
 July 31 – August 4: 2023 RS500 World Championship in  Travemünde
 July 31 – August 4: 2023 H-boat World Championship in  Malcesine–Lake Garda
 July 31 – August 5: 2023 12mR World Championship in  Newport

August
 August 10–20: 2023 Sailing World Championships in  The Hague (main event)
 August 18–25: 2023 Shark 24 World Championship in  Niagara-on-the-Lake
 August 21–26: 2023 TP 52 World Championship in  Barcelona
 August 22–26: 2023 Tempest World Championship in  Portsmouth
 August 26 – September 1: 2023 Micro Class World Championship in  Gdańsk
 August 27 – September 3: 2023 470 Junior World Championships in  Nida
 August 28 – September 2: 2023 8 Metre World Championship in  Genoa
 August 31 – September 8: 2023 6 Metre World Championship in  Cowes Castle

Sailing Continental Championships
Africa
 May 2–9: 2023 Optimist African Championship at the  Royal Yacht Club de M'diq

North America & the Caribbean
 March 6–12: 2023 Formula Kite Pan American Championships in  Cabarete
 July 2–29: 2023 Optimist North American Championship in  Antigua Yacht Club
 July 14–16: 2023 ILCA North American Championship in  Long Beach

South America
 April 3–9: 2023 Snipe South American Championship in  Paracas
 April 15–22: 2023 Optimist South American Championship in  Paracas

Europe
 April 15–22: 2023 EurILCA European Championships in  Andora
 May 12–14: 2023 Open Finn European Championship in  Lake Balaton
 May 12–20: 2023 470 Open European Championships in  Sanremo
 May 22–28: 2023 Formula Kite Youth (U21) European Championships in  Oristano
 July 1–9: 2023 iQFOiL Youth & Junior European Championships in  Torbole-Lake Garda
 July 3–10: 2023 420 & 470 Junior European Championships in  Gdynia
 July 15–22: 2023 Optimist European Championship in  Thessaloniki
 July 24–29: 2023 International FJ Junior European Championship in  Portorož
 July 24–29: 2023 Splash European Championship in  IJsselmeer
 August 10–20: 2023 29er European Championship in  Stockholm
 August 21–27: 2023 Snipe European Championship in  Gargnano
 August 25–30: 2023 Optimist European Team Racing Championship in  Loosdrecht

Oceania
 January 9–13: 2023 Contender Australian Championship in  Perth
 Winner:  Mark Bulka

Shooting sports

World & Continental Championships
 February 20 – March 2: 2023 Asian Shotgun Cup in  Kuwait City
 March 5–15: 2023 European 10 m Events Championships in  Tallinn
 July 14–28: 2023 ISSF Junior World Championships in  Changwon
 August 14 – September 3: 2023 ISSF World Shooting Championships in  Baku
 September 4–20: 2023 European Shotgun Championships in  Leobersdorf
 October 22 – November 5: 2023 Asian Shooting Championships in  Changwon
 October 30 – November 6: 2023 Oceania Shooting Championships in  Sydney

2023 ISSF World Cup
 February 17–28: Rifle/Pistol WC #1 in  Cairo
 March 4–15: Shotgun WC #1 in  Doha
 March 20–31: Rifle/Pistol WC #2 in  Bhopal
 March 25 – April 6: Shotgun WC #2 in  Larnaca
 June 1–12: ISSF Junior World Cup in  Suhl
 September 8–19: Rifle/Pistol WC #3 in  Rio de Janeiro
 TBA: ISSF Grand Prix in  Konya

Ski jumping

SJ World Championships
 February 22 – March 5: FIS Nordic World Ski Championships 2023 in  Planica

SJ World Cup
 November 4–6, 2022: World Cup #1 in  Wisła
 Men's winner:  Dawid Kubacki (2 times)
 Women's winners:  Silje Opseth (#1) /  Eva Pinkelnig (#2)
 November 25–27, 2022: World Cup #2 in  Rukatunturi
 Men's winners:  Anže Lanišek (#1) /  Stefan Kraft (#2)
 December 2–4, 2022: World Cup #3 in  Lillehammer #1
 Women's winners:  Katharina Althaus (#1) /  Silje Opseth (#2)
 December 8–11, 2022: World Cup #4 in  Titisee-Neustadt
 Men's winners:  Anže Lanišek (#1) /  Dawid Kubacki (#2)
 Women's winner:  Katharina Althaus
 Mixed Team winners:  (Marita Kramer, Michael Hayböck, Eva Pinkelnig, & Stefan Kraft)
 December 16–18, 2022: World Cup #5 in  Engelberg
 Men's winners:  Anže Lanišek (#1) /  Dawid Kubacki (#2)
 December 27–29, 2022: World Cup #6 in  Villach
 Women's winner:  Eva Pinkelnig (2 times)
 December 28 & 29, 2022: World Cup #7 in  Oberstdorf
 Men's winner:  Halvor Egner Granerud
 December 30, 2022 – January 1: World Cup #8 in  Ljubno ob Savinji
 Women's winners:  Anna Odine Strøm (#1) /  Eva Pinkelnig (#2)
 December 31, 2022 & January 1: World Cup #9 in  Garmisch-Partenkirchen
 Men's winner:  Halvor Egner Granerud
 January 3 & 4: World Cup #10 in  Innsbruck
 Men's winner:  Dawid Kubacki
 January 5 & 6: World Cup #11 in  Bischofshofen
 Men's winner:  Halvor Egner Granerud
 January 6–8: World Cup #12 in  Sapporo #1
 Women's winners:  Katharina Althaus (#1) /  Silje Opseth (#2)
 January 12–15: World Cup #13 in  Zaō
 Women's individual winners:  Alexandria Loutitt (#1) /  Eva Pinkelnig (#2)
 Women's team winners:  (Chiara Kreuzer & Eva Pinkelnig)
 January 13–15: World Cup #14 in  Zakopane
 Men's individual winner:  Halvor Egner Granerud
 Men's team winners:  (Daniel Tschofenig, Michael Hayböck, Manuel Fettner, & Stefan Kraft)
 January 19–22: World Cup #15 in  Sapporo #2
 Men's winners:  Ryōyū Kobayashi (#1; 2 times) /  Stefan Kraft (#2)
 January 27–29: World Cup #16 in  Kulm Mitterndorf
 Men's winners: (#1) / (#2)
 January 27–29: World Cup #17 in  Hinterzarten
 Women's winners: (#1) / (#2)
 February 2–5: World Cup #18 in  Willingen
 February 10 & 11: World Cup #19 in  Hinzenbach
 February 10–12: Original World Cup #20 in  Iron Mountain
 The two Men's Ski Jumping events were cancelled.
 February 10–12: Replaced World Cup #20 in  Lake Placid
 Men's individual winners: (#1) / (#2)
 Men's team winners: 
 February 17–19: World Cup #21 in  Râșnov
 March 10–12: World Cup #22 in  Oslo
 March 13–16: World Cup #23 in  Lillehammer #2
 March 15 & 16: World Cup #24 in  Trondheim
 The individual Men's & Women's events were cancelled.
 March 17–19: World Cup #25 in  Vikersund
 March 23–26: World Cup #26 in  Lahti
 March 30 – April 2: World Cup #27 (final) in  Planica

2022–23 FIS Ski Jumping Continental Cup
 September 3 & 4, 2022: CC #1 in  Lillehammer
 Men's winners:  Sondre Ringen (2 times)
 Women's winners:  Abigail Strate (2 times)
 September 17 & 18, 2022: CC #2 in  Stams (Men's only)
 Winners:  Michael Hayböck (1st) /  Aleksander Zniszczoł (2nd)
 September 24 & 25, 2022: CC #3 in  Klingenthal (Men's only)
 Winners:  Sondre Ringen (1st) /  Michael Hayböck (2nd)
 October 7–9, 2022: CC #4 in  Lake Placid
 Men's winner:  Michael Hayböck (3 times)
 Women's winners:  Abigail Strate (3 times)

2022 FIS Ski Jumping Grand Prix
Summer
 July 22–24, 2022: GP #1 in  Wisła
 Men's winners:  Dawid Kubacki (1st) /  Kamil Stoch (2nd)
 Women's winners:  Urša Bogataj (1st) /  Nika Križnar (2nd)
 August 5–7, 2022: GP #2 in  Courchevel
 Winners:  Manuel Fettner (m) /  Urša Bogataj (f)
 September 16–18, 2022: GP #3 in  Râșnov
 Winners:  Ren Nikaido (m) /  Eva Pinkelnig (f)
 Men's team winners:  (Daniel Tschofenig & Manuel Fettner)
 Mixed team winners:  (Julia Mühlbacher, Jan Hörl, Eva Pinkelnig, Daniel Tschofenig)
 September 24 & 25, 2022: GP #4 in  Hinzenbach (Men's only)
 Winner:  Dawid Kubacki
 September 30 – October 2, 2022: GP #5 in  Klingenthal
 Winners:  Dawid Kubacki (m) /  Urša Bogataj (f)
 Mixed team winners:  (Silje Opseth, Marius Lindvik, Thea Minyan Bjørseth, Daniel-André Tande)

2022–23 Alpen Cup
 August 7 & 8, 2022: OPA #1 in  Klingenthal (Women's only)
 Winner:  Lilou Zepchi (2 times)
 August 10 & 11, 2022: OPA #2 in  Pöhla (Women's only)
 Winner:  Lilou Zepchi (2 times)
 August 12 & 13, 2022: OPA #3 in  Bischofsgrün (Women's only)
 Winner:  Ajda Košnjek
 September 10 & 11, 2022: OPA #4 in  Oberstdorf (Men's only)
 Winner:  Maksim Bartolj (2 times)
 September 17 & 18, 2022: OPA #5 in  Schwäbisch Gmünd (Women's only)
 Winner:  Taja Bodlaj (2 times)
 September 24 & 25, 2022: OPA #5 in  Liberec (Men's only)
 Winner:  Rok Masle (2 times)
 October 8 & 9, 2022: OPA #6 in  Gérardmer
 Men's winner:  Alexei Urevc
 Women's winner:  Tina Erzar
 Men's Team winners:  I (Kai Zakelšek, Blaž Jurčić, Alexei Urevc)
 Women's Team winners:  II (Ula Vodlan, Živa Andrić, Tina Erzar)

2022–23 FIS Cup
Summer
 July 30 & 31, 2022: FC #1 in  Otepää
Cancelled due to organizational problems.
 August 12 & 13, 2022: FC #2 in  Frenštát pod Radhoštěm (Men's only)
 Winners:  Eric Fuchs (1st) /  Janni Reisenauer (2nd)
 August 20 & 21, 2022: FC #3 in  Szczyrk
 Men's winners:  Niklas Bachlinger (1st) /  Maximilian Lienher (2nd)
 Women's winners:  Hannah Wiegele (1st) /  Ajda Košnjek (2nd)
 August 26–28, 2022: FC #4 in  Einsiedeln
 Men's winners:  Marco Wörgötter (1st) /  Jonas Schuster (2nd)
 Women's winner:  Nicole Konderla (2 times)
 September 2 & 3, 2022: FC #5 in  Kranj
 Men's winners:  Anže Lanišek (1st) /  Janni Reisenauer (2nd)
 Women's winners:  Nika Križnar (1st) /  Nika Prevc (2nd)
 September 10 & 11, 2022: OPA #6 in  Villach
 Men's winners:  Tomasz Pilch (1st) /  Francesco Cecon (2nd)
 Women's winners:  Nika Prevc (1st) /  Hannah Wiegele (2nd)

Ski mountaineering

ISMF World Championships
 February 26 – March 4: 2023 World Championship of Ski Mountaineering in  Boí Taüll Resort
 March 25: 2023 ISMF Long Distance Team World Championships in  Ponte di Legno–Tonale

2022–23 ISMF World Cup Ski Mountaineering
 November 25–27, 2022: World Cup #1 in  Val Thorens
 Sprint Race winners:  Arno Lietha (m) /  Emily Harrop (f)
 Women's U23 Sprint Race winner:  Emily Harrop
 Mixed Relay Race winners:  (Emily Harrop & Thibault Anselmet)
 December 16–18, 2022: World Cup #2 in  Ponte di Legno-Tonale
 Individual winners:  Rémi Bonnet (m) /  Axelle Mollaret (f)
 Sprint Race winners:  Arno Lietha (m) /  Celia Perillat-Pessey (f)
 January 21 & 22: World Cup #3 in  Arinsal–La Massana
 Individual winners:  Thibault Anselmet (m) /  Axelle Mollaret (f)
 Vertical winners:  Rémi Bonnet (m) /  Axelle Mollaret (f)
 February 7–10: World Cup #4 in  Morgins
 February 16: World Cup #5 in  Val Martello
 March 18: World Cup #6 in  Schladming
 April 11: World Cup #7 (final) in  Tromsø

Snowboarding

Snowboarding World Championships
 February 19 – March 4: FIS Freestyle Ski and Snowboarding World Championships 2023 in  Bakuriani
 March 24–27: 2023 FIS Snowboard Alpine Junior World Championship in  Bansko
 March 30 & 31: 2023 FIS Snowboard Cross Junior World Championship in  San Pellegrino Pass
 August 28 – September 8: 2023 FIS Snowboard Park & Pipe Junior World Championship in  Cardrona

Alpine snowboarding
 December 10 & 11, 2022: AS World Cup #1 in  Winterberg
 Parallel Slalom winners:  Alexander Payer (m) /  Sabine Schöffmann (f)
 Team Parallel Slalom winners:  (Gian Casanova & Ladina Jenny)
 December 15, 2022: AS World Cup #2 in  Carezza Dolomites
 Parallel Giant Slalom winners:  Andreas Prommegger (m) /  Michelle Dekker (f)
 December 17, 2022: AS World Cup #3 in  Cortina d'Ampezzo
 Parallel Giant Slalom winners:  Roland Fischnaller (m) /  Gloria Kotnik (f)
 January 10 & 11: AS World Cup #4 in  Bad Gastein
 Parallel Slalom winners:  Maurizio Bormolini (m) /  Daniela Ulbing (f)
 Team Parallel Slalom winners:  (Andreas Prommegger & Daniela Ulbing)
 January 14: AS World Cup #5 in  Scuol
 Parallel Giant Slalom winners:  Oskar Kwiatkowski (m) /  Carolin Langenhorst (f)
 January 21 & 22: AS World Cup #6 in  Bansko
 Men's Parallel Slalom winners:  Dario Caviezel (#1) /  Maurizio Bormolini (#2)
 Women's Parallel Slalom winner:  Julie Zogg (2 times)
 January 26 & 27: AS World Cup #7 in  Blue Mountain
 Men's Parallel Giant Slalom winners: (#1) / (#2)
 Women's Parallel Giant Slalom winners: (#1) / (#2)
 March 11 & 12: Original AS World Cup #8 in  Piancavallo
 All Parallel Slalom events were cancelled.
 March 11 & 12: Replaced AS World Cup #8 in  Livigno
 Parallel Giant Slalom winners: (m) / (f)
 Parallel Slalom winners: (m) / (f)
 March 15: AS World Cup #9 in  Rogla Ski Resort
 March 18 & 19: AS World Cup #10 (final) in  Berchtesgaden

Half-pipe, Big air, & Slopestyle World Cup
 October 22, 2022: HBS World Cup #1 in  Chur
 Big Air winners:  Takeru Otsuka (m) /  Reira Iwabuchi (f)
 November 24–26, 2022: HBS World Cup #2 in  Falun
 Both Big Air events are cancelled.
 December 9 & 10, 2022: HBS World Cup #3 in  Edmonton
 Big Air winners:  Valentino Guseli (m) /  Jasmine Baird (f)
 December 14–17, 2022: HBS World Cup #4 in  Copper Mountain
 Big Air winners:  Marcus Kleveland (m) /  Mari Fukada (f)
 Halfpipe winners:  Scotty James (m) /  Queralt Castellet (f)
 January 13 & 14: HBS World Cup #5 in  Kreischberg
 Big Air winners:  Taiga Hasegawa (m) /  Anna Gasser (f)
 January 18–21: HBS World Cup #6 in  Laax
 Both Halfpipe events are cancelled.
 Slopestyle winners:  Marcus Kleveland (m) /  Zoi Sadowski-Synnott (f)
 February 1–4: HBS World Cup #7 in  Mammoth Mountain Ski Area
 February 9–12: HBS World Cup #8 in  Calgary
 March 10–12: HBS World Cup #9 in  Secret Garden
 Both Halfpipe events are cancelled.
 March 24–26: HBS World Cup #10 (final) in  Silvaplana

Snowboard cross World Cup
 December 2–4, 2022: SC World Cup #1 in  Les Deux Alpes
 Individual winners:  Martin Nörl (m) /  Josie Baff (f)
 December 15–17, 2022: SC World Cup #2 in  Breuil-Cervinia
 Men's Individual winners:  Alessandro Hämmerle (#1) /  Loan Bozzolo (#2) 
 Women's Individual winners:  Chloé Trespeuch (#1) /  Charlotte Bankes (#2)
 December 18–20, 2022: SC World Cup #3 in  Montafon
 All Snowboard Cross events were cancelled.
 January 27 & 28: SC World Cup #4 in  Cortina d'Ampezzo
 Individual winners: (m) / (f)
 February 3–5: SC World Cup #5 in  Mont-Sainte-Anne
 March 10–12: SC World Cup #6 in  Sierra Nevada Ski Station
 March 15 & 16: SC World Cup #7 (final) in  Veysonnaz

European Cup
 November 24, 2022: EC #1 in  Pitztal
 Snowboard Cross winners:  Martin Nörl (m) /  Francesca Gallina (f)

Australia/New Zealand Cup
 August 1–5, 2022: ANC #1 in  Perisher Ski Resort
 Slopestyle #1 winners:  Matthew Cox (m) /  Mia Brookes (f)
 Slopestyle #2 winners:  Valentino Guseli (m) /  Mia Brookes (f)
 Big Air winners:  Valentino Guseli (m) /  Mia Brookes (f)
 September 1–4, 2022: ANC #2 in  Cardrona
 Halfpipe winners:  Lee Cha-eun (m) /  Choi Ga-on
 Slopestyle winners:  Jesse Parkinson (m) /  Mari Fukada (f)
 September 1–4, 2022: ANC #3 in  Mount Hotham
 Snowboard Cross #1 winners:  Adam Lambert (m) /  Josie Baff (f)
 Snowboard Cross #2 winners:  Adam Lambert (m) /  Josie Baff (f)
 Snowboard Cross #3 winners:  Cameron Bolton (m) /  Josie Baff (f)
 October 1–8, 2022: ANC #4 in  Cardrona
 Slopestyle winners:  Ryoma Kimata (m) /  Lucia Georgalli (f)
 Halfpipe winners:  Jason Wolle (m) /  Sara Shimizu (f)
 Big Air winners:  Ryoma Kimata (m) /  Mari Fukada (f)

Snowboard South American Cup
 August 4–7, 2022: SAC #1 in  La Parva
 Big Air #1 winners:  Federico Chiaradio (m) /  Amanda Cardone (f)
 Big Air #2 winners:  Valentín Moreno (m) / No events
 August 8 & 9, 2022: SAC #2 in  El Colorado
 Big Air #1 winners:  Federico Chiaradio (m) /  Amanda Cardone (f)
 Big Air #2 winners:  Valentín Moreno (m) / No events
 August 10–12, 2022: SAC #3 in  La Parva
 Cancelled.
 August 29 & 30, 2022: SAC #4 in  Corralco
 Snowboard Cross #1 winners:  Connor Schlegel (m) /  Madeline Lochte-Bono (f)
 Snowboard Cross #2 winners:  Noah Bethonico (m) /  Madeline Lochte-Bono (f)
 September 7–12, 2022: SAC #5 in  Cerro Catedral
 Men's Slopestyle winners:  Federico Chiaradio (1st) /  Manuel Fasola (2nd)
 Men's Big Air winners:  Álvaro Yáñez (2 times)
 Here, Women's Slopestyle and Big Air events are cancelled.
 September 15–17, 2022: SAC #6 in  La Parva
 Men's Snowboard Cross winners:  Noah Bethonico (2 times)
 Here, Women's Snowboard Cross competitions are cancelled.
 September 19–23, 2022: SAC #7 in  Chapelco
 Men's Slopestyle winner:  Álvaro Yáñez
 Here, Women's Slopestyle and Big Air events are cancelled.

Speed skating

Long-track speed skating World & Continental championships
 December 2–4, 2022: 2022 ISU Four Continents Speed Skating Championships in  Quebec City
 500 m winners:  Laurent Dubreuil (m) /  Kim Min-sun (f)
 1000 m winners:  Laurent Dubreuil (m) /  Kim Min-sun (f)
 1500 m winners:  Antoine Gélinas-Beaulieu (m) /  Nadezhda Morozova (f)
 Men's 5000 m winner:  Vitaliy Chshigolev
 Women's 3000 m winner:  Valérie Maltais
 Mass Start winners:  Chung Jae-won (m) /  Valérie Maltais (f)
 Men's Team Pursuit winners:  (Chung Jae-won, Um Cheon-ho, & YANG Ho-jun)
 Women's Team Pursuit winners:  (Béatrice Lamarche, Maddison Pearman, & Valérie Maltais)
 Men's Team Sprint winners:  (Christopher Fiola, Laurent Dubreuil, & David La Rue)
 Women's Team Sprint winners:  (ZHANG Lina, PEI Chong, & YANG Binyu)
 January 6–8: 2023 European Speed Skating Championships in  Hamar
 Men's 500 m Sprint winners:  David Bosa (#1) /  Merijn Scheperkamp (#2)
 Women's 500 m Sprint winners:  Femke Kok (#1) /  Jutta Leerdam (#2)
 Men's 1000 m Sprint winner:  Hein Otterspeer (2 times)
 Women's 1000 m Sprint winner:  Jutta Leerdam (2 times)
 All-round 500 m winners:  Patrick Roest (m) /  Antoinette de Jong (f)
 All-round 1500 m winners:  Sander Eitrem (m) /  Antoinette de Jong (f)
 All-round 5000 m winners:  Sander Eitrem (m) /  Ragne Wiklund (f)
 All-round Men's 10000 m winner:  Patrick Roest
 All-round Women's 3000 m winner:  Ragne Wiklund
 February 10–12: 2023 World Junior Speed Skating Championships in  Inzell
 500 m winners:  Jordan Stolz (m) /  Serena Pergher (f)
 1000 m winners:  Jordan Stolz (m) /  Angel Daleman (f)
 1500 m winners:  Jordan Stolz (m) /  Angel Daleman (f)
 Men's 5000 m winner:  Sigurd Henriksen
 Women's 3000 m winner:  Momoka Horikawa
 Mass Start winners:  Lukáš Steklý (m) /  Angel Daleman (f)
 Men's Team Pursuit winners:  (Sijmen Egberts, Tim Prins, & Remco Stam)
 Women's Team Pursuit winners:  (Chloé Hoogendoorn, Jade Groenewoud, & Angel Daleman)
 Men's Team Sprint winners:  (Jonathan Tobon, Auggie Herman, & Jordan Stolz)
 Women's Team Sprint winners:  (Pien Hersman, Pien Smit, & Angel Daleman)
 March 2–5: 2023 World Single Distances Speed Skating Championships in  Heerenveen

Long-track speed skating World Cup
 November 11–13, 2022: LTSS World Cup #1 in  Stavanger
 500 m winners:  Yuma Murakami (m) /  Kim Min-sun (f)
 1000 m winners:  Jordan Stolz (m) /  Jutta Leerdam (f)
 1500 m winners:  Jordan Stolz (m) /  Miho Takagi (f)
 Men's 5000 m winner:  Patrick Roest
 Women's 3000 m winner:  Ragne Wiklund
 Mass Start winners:  Felix Rijhnen (m) /  Ivanie Blondin (f)
 Team Pursuit winners:  (m) /  (f)
 November 18–20, 2022: LTSS World Cup #2 in  Heerenveen
 500 m winners:  Laurent Dubreuil (m) /  Kim Min-sun (f)
 1000 m winners:  Ning Zhongyan (m) /  Jutta Leerdam (f)
 1500 m winners:  Connor Howe (m) /  Antoinette de Jong (f)
 Men's 5000 m winner:  Patrick Roest
 Women's 3000 m winner:  Irene Schouten
 Mass Start winners:  Bart Hoolwerf (m) /  Irene Schouten (f)
 Team Sprint winners:  (m) /  (f)
 December 9–11, 2022: LTSS World Cup #3 in  Calgary #1
 500 m winners:  Laurent Dubreuil (m) /  Kim Min-sun (f)
 1000 m winners:  Hein Otterspeer (m) /  Jutta Leerdam (f)
 1500 m winners:  Wesly Dijs (m) /  Miho Takagi (f)
 Men's 5000 m winner:  Patrick Roest
 Women's 3000 m winner:  Ragne Wiklund
 Mass Start winners:  Andrea Giovannini (m) /  Irene Schouten (f)
 Team Pursuit winners:  (m) /  (f)
 December 16–18, 2022: LTSS World Cup #4 in  Calgary #2
 500 m winners:  Kim Jun-ho (m) /  Kim Min-sun (f)
 1000 m winners:  Jordan Stolz (m) /  Jutta Leerdam (f)
 1500 m winners:  Kjeld Nuis (m) /  Miho Takagi (f)
 Men's 10000 m winner:  Davide Ghiotto
 Women's 5000 m winner:  Irene Schouten
 Mass Start winners:  Bart Swings (m) /  Irene Schouten (f)
 Team Sprint winners:  (m) /  (f)
 February 10–12: LTSS World Cup #5 in  Tomaszów Mazowiecki #1
 500 m winners:  Wataru Morishige (m) /  Kim Min-sun (f)
 1000 m winners:  Hein Otterspeer (m) /  Kimi Goetz (f)
 1500 m winners:  Kjeld Nuis (m) /  Marijke Groenewoud (f)
 Men's 5000 m winner:  Davide Ghiotto
 Women's 3000 m winner:  Ragne Wiklund
 Mass Start winners:  Bart Swings (m) /  Marijke Groenewoud (f)
 Team Pursuit winners:  (m) /  (f)
 February 17–19: LTSS World Cup #6 (final) in  Tomaszów Mazowiecki #2
 500 m winners:  Yuma Murakami (m) /  Vanessa Herzog (f)
 1000 m winners:  Wesly Dijs (m) /  Jutta Leerdam (f)
 1500 m winners:  Jordan Stolz (m) / (f)
 Men's 5000 m winner:  Sander Eitrem
 Women's 3000 m winner:  Ragne Wiklund
 Mass Start winners:  Bart Hoolwerf (m) /  Momoka Horikawa (f)
 Team Sprint winners:  (m) /  (f)

Short-track speed skating World & Continental championships
 November 10–12, 2022: 2023 Four Continents Short Track Speed Skating Championships in  Salt Lake City
 500 m winners:  Steven Dubois (m) /  Shim Suk-hee (f)
 1000 m winners:  Park Ji-won (m) /  Courtney Sarault (f)
 1500 m winners:  Park Ji-won (m) /  Courtney Sarault (f)
 Men's 5000 m Relay winners:  (LI Kun, LIU Guanyi, SONG Jiahua, & ZHONG Yuchen)
 Women's 3000 m Relay winners:  (Choi Min-jeong, KIM Gil-li, LEE So-youn, & Shim Suk-hee)
 Mixed Relay winners:  (Andrew Heo, Marcus Howard, Kristen Santos-Griswold, & Corinne Stoddard)
 January 13–15: 2023 European Short Track Speed Skating Championships in  Gdańsk
 500 m winners:  Pietro Sighel (m) /  Suzanne Schulting (f)
 1000 m winners:  Stijn Desmet (m) /  Hanne Desmet (f)
 1500 m winners:  Jens van 't Wout (m) /  Suzanne Schulting (f)
 Men's 5000 m Relay winners:  (Itzhak de Laat, Friso Emons, Jens van 't Wout, & Melle van 't Wout)
 Women's 3000 m Relay winners:  (Selma Poutsma, Suzanne Schulting, Yara van Kerkhof, & Xandra Velzeboer)
 Mixed Relay winners:  (Itzhak de Laat, Suzanne Schulting, Jens van 't Wout, & Xandra Velzeboer)
 January 27–29: 2023 World Junior Short Track Speed Skating Championships in  Dresden
 500 m winners:  Michał Niewiński (m) /  Florence Brunelle (f)
 1000 m winners:  LEE Dong-hyun (m) /  KIM Gil-li (f)
 1500 m winners:  LEE Dong-hyun (m) /  KIM Gil-li (f)
 Men's 3000 m Relay winners:  (LEE Do-gyu, LEE Dong-hyun, LEE Dong-min, & SHIN Dong-min)
 Women's 3000 m Relay winners:  (KIM Gil-li, KIM Ji-won, OH Song-mi, & SEO Su-ah)
 March 10–12: 2023 World Short Track Speed Skating Championships in  Seoul

Short-track speed skating World Cup
 October 28–30, 2022: STSS World Cup #1 in  Montreal
 Men's 500 m winner:  Steven Dubois
 Men's 1000 m winners:  Roberts Kruzbergs (#1) /  Pascal Dion (#2)
 Men's 1500 m winner:  Park Ji-won
 Men's 5000 m Relay winners:  (HONG Kyung-hwan, Lee June-seo, LIM Yong-jin, & Park Ji-won)
 Women's 500 m winner:  Xandra Velzeboer
 Women's 1000 m winners:  Xandra Velzeboer (#1) /  Suzanne Schulting (#2)
 Women's 1500 m winner:  Suzanne Schulting
 Women's 3000 m Relay winners:  (Selma Poutsma, Suzanne Schulting, Michelle Velzeboer, & Xandra Velzeboer)
 Mixed 2000 m Relay winners:  (HONG Kyung-hwan, Kim Geon-hee, LIM Yong-jin, & Shim Suk-hee)
 November 4–6, 2022: STSS World Cup #2 in  Salt Lake City
 Men's 500 m winners:  Maxime Laoun (#1) /  Jens van 't Wout (#2)
 Men's 1000 m winner:  Park Ji-won
 Men's 1500 m winner:  Jens van 't Wout
 Men's 5000 m Relay winners:  (Pascal Dion, Steven Dubois, Maxime Laoun, & Jordan Pierre-Gilles)
 Women's 500 m winners:  Kim Boutin (#1) /  Xandra Velzeboer (#2)
 Women's 1000 m winner:  Suzanne Schulting
 Women's 1500 m winner:  KIM Gil-li
 Women's 3000 m Relay winners:  (Kim Geon-hee, KIM Gil-li, Seo Whi-min, & Shim Suk-hee)
 Mixed 2000 m Relay winners:  (Li Wenlong, WANG Xinran, Zhang Chutong, & ZHONG Yuchen)
 December 9–11, 2022: STSS World Cup #3 in  Almaty #1
 Men's 500 m winner:  KIM Tae-sung
 Men's 1000 m winner:  Jens van 't Wout
 Men's 1500 m winners:  HONG Kyung-hwan (#1) /  Park Ji-won
 Men's 5000 m Relay winners:  (Steven Dubois, Maxime Laoun, Jordan Pierre-Gilles, & Felix Roussel)
 Women's 500 m winner:  Kim Boutin
 Women's 1000 m winner:  Courtney Sarault
 Women's 1500 m winners:  Suzanne Schulting (#1) /  Hanne Desmet (#2)
 Women's 3000 m Relay winners:  (Kim Boutin, Rikki Doak, Claudia Gagnon, & Courtney Sarault)
 Mixed 2000 m Relay winners:  (Choi Min-jeong, HONG Kyung-hwan, KIM Gil-li, & LIM Yong-jin)
 December 16–18, 2022: STSS World Cup #4 in  Almaty #2
 Men's 500 m winners:  Diane Sellier (#1) /  Denis Nikisha (#2)
 Men's 1000 m winner:  Park Ji-won
 Men's 1500 m winner:  Park Ji-won
 Men's 5000 m Relay winners:  (William Dandjinou, Pascal Dion, Maxime Laoun, & Jordan Pierre-Gilles)
 Women's 500 m winners:  Suzanne Schulting (#1) /  Yara van Kerkhof (#2)
 Women's 1000 m winner:  Suzanne Schulting
 Women's 1500 m winner:  Courtney Sarault
 Women's 3000 m Relay winners:  (KIM Gil-li, LEE So-youn, Seo Whi-min, & Shim Suk-hee)
 Mixed 2000 m Relay winners:  (KIM Gil-li, LIM Yong-jin, Park Ji-won, & Shim Suk-hee)
 February 3–5: STSS World Cup #5 in  Dresden
 Men's 500 m winner:  Lim Hyo-jun
 Men's 1000 m winner:  Park Ji-won
 Men's 1500 m winners:  Lee June-seo (#1) /  Park Ji-won (#2)
 Men's 5000 m Relay winners:  (Li Wenlong, Lim Hyo-jun, LIU Guanyi, & ZHONG Yuchen)
 Women's 500 m winner:  Suzanne Schulting
 Women's 1000 m winner:  Suzanne Schulting
 Women's 1500 m winners:  Choi Min-jeong (#1) /  KIM Gil-li (#2)
 Women's 3000 m Relay winners:  (Selma Poutsma, Suzanne Schulting, Yara van Kerkhof, & Xandra Velzeboer)
 Mixed 2000 m Relay winners:  (Thomas Nadalini, Arianna Sighel, Pietro Sighel, & Arianna Valcepina)
 February 10–12: STSS World Cup #6 (final) in  Dordrecht
 Men's 500 m winner:  Lim Hyo-jun
 Men's 1000 m winners:  Steven Dubois (#1) /  Park Ji-won (#2)
 Men's 1500 m winner:  Park Ji-won
 Men's 5000 m Relay winners:  (KIM Tae-sung, LEE Dong-hyun, LIM Yong-jin, & Park Ji-won)
 Women's 500 m winner:  Xandra Velzeboer
 Women's 1000 m winners:  Kim Boutin (#1) /  Courtney Sarault (#2)
 Women's 1500 m winner:  Hanne Desmet
 Women's 3000 m Relay winners:  (Kim Boutin, Rikki Doak, Courtney Sarault, & Renée Marie Steenge)
 Mixed 2000 m Relay winners:  (Itzhak de Laat, Suzanne Schulting, Jens van 't Wout, & Xandra Velzeboer)

Sport climbing

World championships
 August 1–12: 2023 IFSC Climbing World Championships in  Bern

2023 IFSC Climbing World Cup
 April 21–23: CWC #1 in  Hachiōji
 April 28–30: CWC #2 in  Seoul
 May 19–21: CWC #4 in  Salt Lake City
 June 2–4: CWC #5 in  Prague
 June 9–11: CWC #6 in  Brixen
 June 14–18: CWC #7 in  Innsbruck
 June 30 – July 2: CWC #8 in  Villars-sur-Ollon
 July 7–9: CWC #9 in  Chamonix
 July 14 & 15: CWC #10 in  Briançon
 September 1 & 2: CWC #11 in  Koper
 September 22–24: CWC #12 (final) in  Wujiang

Sport Fishing

Squash

2022–23 PSA World Tour

Gold
 September 6–11, 2022: South Western Women's Open in  Houston
 Women's:  Nouran Gohar defeated  Nour El Tayeb, 12–10, 11–5, 11–7, to win their 18th PSA title.
 October 18–23, 2022: Grasshopper Cup in  Zürich
 Men's:  Mostafa Asal defeated  Marwan El Shorbagy, 13–11, 11–2, 11–5, to win their 9th PSA title.
 Women's:  Nour El Sherbini defeated  Hania El Hammamy, 9–11, 11–9, 10–12, 11–3, 11–4, to win their 31st PSA title.
 November 15–20, 2022: Singapore Squash Open in  Kallang
 Men's:  Mohamed El Shorbagy defeated  Diego Elías, 11–6, 11–6, 11–8, to win their 48th PSA title.
 Women's:  Joelle King defeated  Nour El Tayeb, 11–6, 12–10, 11–4, to win their 16th PSA title.

Silver
 September 30 – October 4, 2022: Netsuite Open in  San Francisco
 Men's:  Mohamed El Shorbagy defeated  Marwan El Shorbagy, 6–11, 11–9, 11–2, 11–8, to win their 46th PSA title.
 Women's:  Amanda Sobhy defeated  Farida Mohamed, 9–11, 11–5, 11–3, 11–7, to win their 19th PSA title.
 November 8–13, 2022: New Zealand Open in  Tauranga
 Men's:  Mohamed El Shorbagy defeated  Paul Coll, 9–11, 11–8, 11–4, 11–7, to win their 47th PSA title.
 Women's:  Joelle King defeated  Tesni Evans, 11–4, 11–6, 11–5, to win their 15th PSA title.

Bronze
 August 24–28, 2022: ZED Squash Open in  Sheikh Zayed City
 Men's:  Youssef Soliman defeated  Victor Crouin, 11–8, 11–5, 11–6, to win their 9th PSA title.
 Women's:  Nour El Tayeb defeated  Salma Hany, 11–7, 12–14, 11–6, 11–4, to win their 12th PSA title.
 September 12–17, 2022: Open de France in  Nantes
 Men's:  Victor Crouin defeated  Marwan El Shorbagy, 11–6, 9–11, 6–11, 11–8, 12–10, to win their 17th PSA title.
 Women's:  Nele Gilis defeated  Tinne Gilis, 11–9, 11–6, 11–3, to win their 8th PSA title.
 November 22–26, 2022: Malaysian Open in  Kuala Lumpur
 Men's:  Mazen Hesham defeated  Tarek Momen, 2–11, 8–11, 11–6, 11–8, 11–5, to win their 8th PSA title.
 Women's:  Nele Gilis defeated  Olivia Fiechter, 5–11, 11–5, 13–11, 11–9, to win their 10th PSA title.
 December 6–10, 2022: Hong Kong Football Club Open in 
 Men's:  Marwan El Shorbagy defeated  Mazen Hesham, 11–8, 5–11, 11–9, 11–8, to win their 13th PSA title.

Platinum
 September 4–10, 2022: Qatar Classic in  Doha
 Men's:  Mohamed El Shorbagy defeated  Victor Crouin, 11–4, 11–6, 7–11, 11–8, to win their 45th PSA title.
 September 19–25, 2022: Egyptian Open in  Cairo
 Men's:  Ali Farag defeated  Paul Coll, 11–6, 8–11, 11–4, 11–7, to win their 29th PSA title.
 Women's:  Hania El Hammamy defeated  Nouran Gohar, 11–7, 11–13, 11–3, 11–4, to win their 10th PSA title.
 October 8–15, 2022: US Open in  Philadelphia
 Men's:  Diego Elías defeated  Ali Farag, 2–0, rtd., to win their, 12th PSA title.
 Women's:  Nouran Gohar defeated  Nour El Sherbini, 11–7, 9–11, 11–7, 11–6, to win their 19th PSA title.
 November 28 – December 4, 2022: Hong Kong Open in 
 Men's:  Mostafa Asal defeated  Diego Elías, 6–11, 6–11, 12–10, 11–9, 11–4, to win their 10th PSA title.
 Women's:  Hania El Hammamy defeated  Nour El Sherbini, 15–13, 9–11, 11–3, 8–11, 11–9, to win their 11th PSA title.

Surfing

ISA
 TBA: 2023 ISA World Surfing Games (location TBA)
 TBA: 2023 ISA World Junior Surfing Championship (location TBA)
 TBA: 2023 ISA World Para Surfing Championship (location TBA)
 TBA: 2023 ISA World SUP and Paddleboard Championship (location TBA)

2023 World Surf League
 January 29 – February 10: Billabong Pipeline Masters in  Banzai Pipeline (Oahu)
 February 12–23: Hurley Pro Sunset Beach in  Sunset Beach (Oahu)
 March 8–16: MEO Pro Portugal in  Supertubos (Peniche)
 April 4–14: Rip Curl Pro in  Bells Beach, Victoria
 April 20–30: Margaret River Pro in  Margaret River, Western Australia
 May 27 & 28: Freshwater Pro in  Lemoore
 June 9–18: Surf City El Salvador Pro in  La Libertad
 June 23 – July 1: Rio Pro in  Saquarema
 July 13–22: J-Bay Open in  Jeffreys Bay
 August 11–20: Billabong Pro Teahupoo in  Teahupo'o
 September 7–15: 2023 World Surf League Finals in  Trestles (San Clemente, California)

Swimming

Synchronized swimming World Cup
 March 16–18: Artistic Swimming World Cup (ASWC) #1 in  Markham
 April 28–30: ASWC #2 in  Cairo
 May 5–7: ASWC #3 in  Montpellier

Open water swimming Tour
 May 20 & 21: OWS #1 in  Golfo Aranci
 May 27 & 28: OWS #2 in  Setúbal
 August 5 & 6: OWS #3 in  Paris
 October 28 & 29: OWS #4 in  Nantou City
 November 4 & 5: OWS #5 in 
 December 1 & 2: OWS #6 in  Eilat

Table tennis

World, Continental, & Championships
 January 15–21: 2023 World Veterans Table Tennis Championships in  Muscat
 : , : , : 
 March 27 – April 1: 2023 Central American Table Tennis Championships (location TBA)
 April 5–9: 2023 European Under-21 Table Tennis Championships in  Sarajevo
 May 20–28: 2023 World Table Tennis Championships in  Durban
 June 5–11: 2023 South American Table Tennis Championships in  Lima
 July 14–23: 2023 European Youth Table Tennis Championships in  Gliwice
 September 3–9: 2023 Oceania Table Tennis Championships (location TBA)
 September 10–17: 2023 Pan American Table Tennis Championships (location TBA)
 September 10–17: 2023 European Team Table Tennis Championships in  Malmö
 September 11–17: 2023 African Table Tennis Championships in  Tunis

2023 WTT Series 

WTT Contender
 January 10–15: WTT Contender #1 in  Durban
 Singles winners:  Hugo Calderano (m) /  Qian Tianyi (f)
 Men's Doubles winners:  ( (Chen Yuanyu & Lin Shidong)
 Women's Doubles winners:  (Zhang Rui & Man Kuai)
 Mixed Doubles winners:  (Lin Shidong & Man Kuai)
 January 15–21: WTT Contender #2 in  Doha
 Singles winners:  Hugo Calderano (m) /  Siqi Fan (f)
 Men's Doubles winners:  ( (Yu Ziyang & Kai Zhou)
 Women's Doubles winners:  (Zhang Rui & Man Kuai)
 Mixed Doubles winners:  (Lin Shidong & Man Kuai)
 February 6–12: WTT Contender #3 in  Amman
 June 12–18: WTT Contender #4 in  Lagos
 June 19–25: WTT Contender #5 in  Tunis
 June 26 – July 2: WTT Contender #6 in  Zagreb
 July 31 – August 6: WTT Contender #7 in  Lima
 August 7–13: WTT Contender #8 in  Rio de Janeiro

WTT Feeder
 January 22–26: WTT Feeder #1 in  Doha
 Singles winners:  Xu Yingbin (m) /  He Zhuojia (f)
 Men's Doubles winners:  ( (Xiang Peng & Yuan Licen)
 Women's Doubles winners:  (Qian Tianyi & Shi Xunyao)
 Mixed Doubles winners:  (Lin Shidong & Man Kuai)

WTT Youth Contender
 January 11–14: WTT Youth Contender #1 in  Linz
 Singles U19 winners:  Mateusz Żelengowski (m) /  Nicole Arlia (f)
 Singles U17 winners:  Lleyton Ullmann (m) /  Lilou Massart (f)
 Singles U15 winners:  Tsubasa Okamoto (m) /  Koharu Itagaki (f)
 Singles U13 winners:  Danila Faso (m) /  Hanka Kodetová (f)
 Singles U11 winners:  Louis Fegerl (m) /  Lizett Fazekas (f)
 Mixed Doubles U19 winners:  Horia Stefan Ursuț & Alesia Sferlea
 Mixed Doubles U15 winners:  Jan Škalda & Veronika Poláková
 January 27–30: WTT Youth Contender #2 in  Doha

Tennis

2023 Grand Slam
 January 16–29: 2023 Australian Open
 Singles:  Novak Djokovic def.  Stefanos Tsitsipas, 6–3, 7–6(7–4), 7–6(7–5).
 Doubles:  Rinky Hijikata &  Jason Kubler def.  Hugo Nys &  Jan Zielinski, 6–4, 7–6(7–4).
 Mixed:  Luisa Stefani &  Rafael Matos def.  Sania Mirza &  Rohan Bopanna, 7–6(7–2), 6–2.
 May 28 – June 11: 2023 French Open
 July 3–16: 2023 Wimbledon Championships
 August 28 – September 10: 2023 U.S. Open

ATP Tour
 December 29, 2022 – January 8: 2023 United Cup in  Brisbane, Perth,  & Sydney (debut event)
 The  defeated , 3–0, to win the inaugural United Cup championship.
 July 19–23: 2023 Hopman Cup in  Nice
 September 22–24: 2023 Laver Cup in  Vancouver
 November 12–19: 2023 ATP Finals in  Turin
 November 21–26: 2023 Davis Cup Finals in  Málaga

2023 ATP Tour Masters 1000
 March 8–19: 2023 BNP Paribas Open in  Indian Wells
 March 22 – April 2: 2023 Miami Open in the 
 April 9–16: 2023 Monte-Carlo Masters in 
 April 26 – May 7: 2023 Mutua Madrid Open in 
 May 10–21: 2023 Italian Open in  Rome
 August 7–13: 2023 National Bank Open in  Toronto
 August 13–20: 2023 Western & Southern Open in  Mason
 October 4–15: 2023 Rolex Shanghai Masters in 
 October 30 – November 5: 2023 Rolex Paris Masters in 

ATP 250
 January 2–8: 2023 Adelaide International 1 in 
 Singles:  Novak Djokovic def.  Sebastian Korda, 6–7(8–10), 7–6(7–3), 6–4.
 Doubles:  Lloyd Glasspool &  Harri Heliövaara def.  Jamie Murray &  Michael Venus, 6–3, 7–6(7–3).
 January 2–8: 2023 Tata Open Maharashtra in  Pune
 Singles:  Tallon Griekspoor def.  Benjamin Bonzi, 4–6, 7–5, 6–3.
 Doubles:  Sander Gillé &  Joran Vliegen def.  Sriram Balaji &  Jeevan Nedunchezhiyan, 6–4, 6–4.
 January 9–15: 2023 Adelaide International 2 in 
 Singles:  Kwon Soon-woo def.  Roberto Bautista Agut, 6–4, 3–6, 7–6(7–4).
 Doubles:  Marcelo Arévalo &  Jean-Julien Rojer def.  Ivan Dodig &  Austin Krajicek, Walkover.
 January 9–15: 2023 ASB Classic in  Auckland
 Singles:  Richard Gasquet def.  Cameron Norrie, 4–6, 6–4, 6–4.
 Doubles:  Nikola Mektić &  Mate Pavić def.  Nathaniel Lammons &  Jackson Withrow, 6–4, 6–7(5–7), [10–6].
 February 6–12: 2023 Córdoba Open in 
 February 6–12: 2023 Open Sud de France in  Montpellier
 February 6–12: 2023 Dallas Open in

Triathlon

2023 World Triathlon Championship Series
 March 3: WTCS #1 in  Abu Dhabi
 Elite Men : 
 Elite Women : 
 May 13 & 14: WTCS #2 in  Yokohama
 May 27 & 28: WTCS #3 in  Cagliari
 June 24 & 25: WTCS #4 in  Montreal
 July 13 to 16: WTCS #5 in  Hamburg (incorporating Sprint and Mixed Relay Championships)
 July 29 & 30: WTCS #6 in  Sunderland
 September 22–24: WTCS Finals in  Pontevedra

Triathlon World Championships
 March 24–26: 2023 World Triathlon Winter Championships in  Skeikampen
 April 29 – May 7: 2023 World Triathlon Multisport Championships in  Ibiza
 July 13–16: 2023 World Triathlon Sprint Distance Championships and Mixed Relay Championships in  Hamburg

Triathlon Continental Events
Africa
 May 21: 2023 African Triathlon Aquathlon Championships in  Sharm El Sheikh
 August 6: 2023 Africa Triathlon Cross Championships in  Chebba
 September 9 & 10: 2023 Africa Triathlon Sprint Championships in  Shandrani
 October 13–15: 2023 African Triathlon & Duathlon Championships in  Sharm El Sheikh
 November 18: 2023 Africa Triathlon Middle Distance Championships in  Cap Skirring

Americas
 March 11: 2023 Americas Triathlon Para Championships in  Sarasota
 May 6: 2023 Americas Triathlon Aquathlon Championships in  Puerto Cabello
 May 21: 2023 Americas Triathlon Duathlon Championships in  Cali
 June 18 & 19: 2023 Americas Triathlon Mixed Relay Championships in  Huatulco
 September 1–3: 2023 Americas Triathlon Championships #1 in  Veracruz
 September 9: 2023 Americas Triathlon Championships #2 in  Santa Marta
 September 24: 2023 Americas Triathlon Middle Distance Championships in  Formosa
 November 25: 2023 Americas Triathlon Duathlon Championships in  Mérida

Asia
 June 24 & 25: 2023 Asia Triathlon Junior & U23 Championships in  Gamagōri
 October 29: 2023 Asia Triathlon Youth Championships in 
 November 11 & 12: 2023 Asia Triathlon Sprint Championships in  Khobar
 November 25 & 26: 2023 Asia Triathlon Duathlon Championships in  New Clark City

Europe
 January 28 & 29: 2023 European Triathlon Winter Championships in  Sant Julià de Lòria
 Elite winners:  Franco Pesavento (m) /  Sandra Mairhofer (f)
 U23 winners:  Mattia Tanara (m) /  Zuzana Michaličková (f)
 Juniors winners:  Riccardo Giuliano (m) /  Sofía Lozano Barroso (f)
 2x2 Mixed Relay winners:  (Franco Pesavento & Sandra Mairhofer)
 March 17–19: 2023 Europe Triathlon Duathlon Championships in  Venice–Caorle
 June 2–4: 2023 European Triathlon Championships #1 in  Madrid
 July 20–23: 2023 Europe Triathlon Youth Championships Festival in  Banyoles
 August 5 & 6: 2023 Europe Triathlon Championships #2 in  Balıkesir
 August 25–27: 2023 Europe Triathlon Multisport Championships in  Menen
 September 9: 2023 Europe Triathlon Challenge Long Distance Championships in  Almere
 September 23 & 24: 2023 Europe Triathlon Mixed Relay Club Championships in  La Baule

Oceania
 February 5: 2023 Oceania Triathlon Para Championships in  Stockton
 February 25 & 26: 2023 Oceania Triathlon Junior & Mixed Relay Championships in  Taupō
 March 18: 2023 Oceania Triathlon Sprint Championships on  Devonport

2023 World Triathlon Cup
 March 25 & 26: WTC #1 in  New Plymouth
 May 6 & 7: WTC #2 in  Yeongdo District
 June 17 & 18: WTC #3 in  Huatulco
 July 8 & 9: WTC #4 in  Tiszaújváros
 September 2 & 3: WTC #5 in  Valencia
 September 9 & 10: WTC #6 in  Karlovy Vary
 October 7 & 8: WTC #7 in  Arzachena
 October 14 & 15: WTC #8 in  Chengdu
 October 21: WTC #9 in  Tongyeong
 October 28 & 29: WTC #10 in  Miyazaki
 November 11 & 12: WTC #11 in  Viña del Mar
 November 18 & 19: WTC #12 (final) in  Montevideo

Americas Triathlon Cups
 February 11: Americas Triathlon Cup #1 in  La Guaira
 February 26: Americas Triathlon Cup #2 in  Havana
 March 4: Americas Triathlon Cup #3 in  La Paz
 March 5: Americas Triathlon Cup #4 & South American Championships in  Villarrica
 March 11: Americas Trithlon Cup #5 in  Sarasota
 March 12: Americas Triathlon Cup #6 in  Pucón
 April 15 & 16: Americas Triathlon Cup #7 & Para Cup in  St. Peters
 April 23: Americas Triathlon Cup #8 in  Salinas
 April 29 & 30: Americas Triathlon Cup #9 & South American Championships in  Lima
 May 13 & 14: Americas Triathlon Cup #10 & Central America and Caribbean Championships in  Punta Cana
 May 20: Americas Triathlon Cup #11 in  Ixtapa
 June 11: Americas Triathlon Cup #12 in  Chinchiná
 July 8: Americas Triathlon Cup #13 in  Montreal
 July 15: Americas Triathlon Cup #14 in  Long Beach
 July 30: Americas Triathlon Cup #15 in  Manta
 November 12: Americas Triathlon Cup #16 in  Viña del Mar
 November 18: Americas Triathlon Cup #17 in  Montevideo

Europe Triathlon Cups
 March 19: Europe Triathlon Cup #1 in  Melilla
 March 25: Europe Triathlon Cup #2 in  Quarteira
 April 9: Europe Triathlon Cup #3 in  Yenişehir
 May 13: Europe Triathlon Cup #4 in  Caorle
 May 27: Europe Triathlon Cup #5 in  Olsztyn
 June 10: Europe Triathlon Cup #6 in  Rzeszów
 June 17: Europe Triathlon Cup #7 in  Kitzbühel
 June 24: Europe Triathlon Cup #8 in  Wels
 July 1: Europe Triathlon Premium Cup in  Holten
 October 8: Europe Triathlon Cup #9 in  Ceuta
 October 14: Europe Triathlon Cup #10 in  Alanya

Asian Triathlon Cups
 February 25: Asian Triatlon Cup #1 (Sprint) in  Plover Cove
 March 9–11: Asian Triathlon Cup #2 in  Musandam
 April 1 & 2: Asian Triathlon Cup #3 & South Asian Championships in  Pokhara
 April 22 & 23: Asian Triathlon Cup #4 in  Subic Bay
 May 27 & 28: Asian Triathlon Cup #5 in  Osaka
 June 3 & 4: Asian Triathlon Cup #6 in  Samarkand
 July 1 & 2: Asian Triathlon Cup #7 in  Sejong City
 September 9 & 10: Asian Triathlon Cup #8 in  Cholpon-Ata
 October 19 & 20: Asian Duathlon Cup in  Tabriz
 October 28: Asian Triathlon Cup #9 (Standard) in 
 November 4: Asian Triathlon Cup #10 & West Asian Championships in  Aqaba
 November 18 & 19: Asian Triathlon Cup #11 in  Ipoh

Oceania Triathlon Cups
 February 17: Oceania Triathlon Cup #1 in  Wanaka
 February 25: Oceania Triathlon Cup #2 in  Taupo
 April 28: Oceania Triathlon Cup #3 in  Busselton
 April 30: Oceania Triathlon Para Cup in  Busselton

African Triathlon Cups
 February 5: African Duathlon Cup #1 in  Tatu City
 February 26: African Triathlon Cup #1 in  Maselspoort
 March 19: African Triathlon Premium Cup #1 in  Nelson Mandela Bay Metropolitan Municipality
 March 25: African Triathlon Cup #2 in  Swakopmund
 April 1: African Triathlon Cup #3 in  Troutbeck
 May 13: African Triathlon Cup #4 in  M'diq
 May 19: African Triathlon Cup #5 in  Sharm El Sheikh
 May 21: African Duathlon Cup #2 & Paratriathlon Cup in  Sharm El Sheikh
 May 28: African Triathlon Cup #6 & Para Cup in  Hammamet
 July 8: African Triathlon Premium Cup #2 in  Larache
 September 3: African Triathlon Cup #7 in  Monastir
 September 9 & 10: African Paratriathlon Cup in  Shandrani
 September 17: African Triatlon Cup #8 in  Agadir
 October 13–15: African Aquathlon Cup in  Sharm El Sheikh
 November 5: African Triathlon Cup #9 in  Djerba
 November 25: African Triathlon Cup #10 (Sprint) in  Kilifi
 November 25: African Triathlon Cup #11 (Standard) in  Dakhla, Western Sahara

Arena Games Triathlon Series
 February 25: AGTS #1 in  Montreal
 March 12: AGTS #2 in  Sursee
 March 25: AGTS #3 in 
 April 8: AGTS #4 (final) in  London

Underwater sports

Volleyball

FIVB World Championships
 July 7–16: 2023 FIVB Volleyball Men's U21 World Championship in  Manama
 August 4–13: 2023 FIVB Volleyball Boys' U19 World Championship in 
 August 17–26: 2023 FIVB Volleyball Women's U20 World Championship in  León & Aguascalientes City
 December 4–10: 2023 FIVB Volleyball Men's Club World Championship (location TBA)
 December 11–17: 2023 FIVB Volleyball Women's Club World Championship (location TBA)

Other FIVB events
 July 12–16: 2023 FIVB Volleyball Women's Nations League Finals in  Arlington
 July 19–23: 2023 FIVB Volleyball Men's Nations League Finals in  Gdańsk
 TBA: 2023 FIVB Volleyball Men's World Cup in 
 TBA: 2023 FIVB Volleyball Women's World Cup in 
 TBA: 2023 FIVB Volleyball Men's Challenger Cup (location TBA)
 TBA: 2023 FIVB Volleyball Women's Challenger Cup (location TBA)

European Volleyball Confederation (CEV)

Weightlifting

World weightlifting championships
 March 25 – April 1: 2023 Youth World Weightlifting Championships in  Durrës
 September 2–17: 2023 World Weightlifting Championships in  Riyadh
 TBA: 2023 Junior World Weightlifting Championships in  Guadalajara

Continental & Regional weightlifting championships
 March 25 – April 2: 2023 Pan American Weightlifting Championships in  Bariloche
 April 15–23: 2023 European Weightlifting Championships in  Yerevan
 April 16–23: 2023 Central American & Caribbean Weightlifting Championships in  Santo Domingo
 May 3–13: 2023 Asian Weightlifting Championships in  Jinju
 May 10–15: 2023 Pan American Junior Weightlifting Championships in  Manizales
 May 11–20: 2023 African Weightlifting Championships in  Tunis
 July 1–8: 2023 South American Junior & Youth Weightlifting Championships in  Guayaquil
 July 1–10: 2023 European Youth & U15 Weightlifting Championships in  Chișinău
 July 12–16: 2023 Commonwealth Senior, U23, Junior, & Youth Weightlifting Championships in  New Delhi
 July 24 – August 3: 2023 European Junior & U23 Weightlifting Championships in  Bucharest
 July 28 – August 5: 2023 Asian Youth & Junior Weightlifting Championships in  New Delhi
 August 12–17: 2023 Pan American Youth Weightlifting Championships in  Caracas
 August 17–19: 2023 Oceania U23, Junior, & Youth Weightlifting Championships in  Rarotonga
 November 20–24: 2023 Oceania Weightlifting Championships in  Honiara (part of the 2023 Pacific Games)

IWF Grand Prix
 June 2–12: IWF Grand Prix #1 in  Havana
 December 1–17: IWF Grand Prix #2 (final) in  Doha

Wrestling

2023 Wrestling Continental Championships
 13–19 March: 2023 European U23 Wrestling Championships in  Bucharest
Men's Freestyle
 Men's 57 kg winner:  Niklas Stechele
 Men's 61 kg winner:  Andrii Dzhelep
 Men's 65 kg winner:  Khamzat Arsamerzouev
 Men's 70 kg winner:  Magomed Khaniev
 Men's 74 kg winner:  Turan Bayramov
 Men's 79 kg winner:  Georgios Kougioumtsidis
 Men's 86 kg winner:  Rakhim Magamadov
 Men's 92 kg winner:  Andro Margishvili
 Men's 97 kg winner:  Islam Ilyasov
 Men's 125 kg winner:  Georgi Ivanov
Men's Greco Roman
 Men's 55 kg winner:  Denis Florin Mihai
 Men's 60 kg winner:  Elmir Aliyev
 Men's 63 kg winner:  Tino Tapio Ojala 
 Men's 67 kg winner:  Diego Chkhikvadze
 Men's 72 kg winner:  Gurban Gurbanov
 Men's 77 kg winner:  Alexandrin Guțu
 Men's 82 kg winner:  Jonni Sarkkinen 
 Men's 87 kg winner:  Dávid Losonczi 
 Men's 97 kg winner:  Murad Ahmadiyev 
 Men's 130 kg winner:  Mykhailo Vyshnyvetskyi
Women's
 Women's 50 kg winner:  Emma Luttenauer
 Women's 53 kg winner:  Zeynep Yetgil
 Women's 55 kg winner:  Jonna Malmgren
 Women's 57 kg winner:  Anna Hella Szel
 Women's 59 kg winner:  Solomiia Vynnyk
 Women's 62 kg winner:  Iryna Bondar
 Women's 65 kg winner:  Amina Capezan
 Women's 68 kg winner:  Nesrin Baş
 Women's 72 kg winner:  Wiktoria Choluj
 Women's 76 kg winner:  Anastasiya Alpyeyeva
 9-14 April: 2023 Asian Wrestling Championships in  Astana
 17–23 April: 2023 European Wrestling Championships in  Zagreb
 3–7 May: 2023 Pan American Wrestling Championships in  Buenos Aires
 15–21 May: 2023 African Wrestling Championships in  Tunis
 12–18 June: 2023 European Cadets Wrestling Championships in  Tirana
 17–25 June: 2023 Asian U23 and Cadets Wrestling Championship in  Amman City
 22–25 June: 2023 Pan American Cadets Wrestling Championships in  Mexico City
 26 June–2 July: 2023 European Juniors Wrestling Championships in  Santiago de Compostela
 1–9 July: 2023 Asian Juniors Wrestling Championships in  Amman City
 1–9 July: 2023 Pan American Juniors Wrestling Championships in  Santiago
 31 July- 6 August: 2023 World Cadet Wrestling Championships in  Istanbul
 8–9 August: 2023 Oceania Wrestling Championships in  Sydney
 14–20 August: 2023 World Junior Wrestling Championships in  Warsaw
 16–24 September: 2023 World Wrestling Championships in  Belgrade
 10–15 October: 2023 Veterans World Wrestling Championships in  Loutraki
 23–29 October: 2023 U23 World Wrestling Championships in  Tampere
 25–26 November: 2023 Wrestling World Cup – Men's Greco-Roman in  Tehran
 9–10 December: 2023 Wrestling World Cup – Men's freestyle in  Iowa City
 9–10 December: 2023 Wrestling World Cup – Women's freestyle in  Iowa City

2023 Wrestling Ranking Series
Ranking Series Calendar 2023:
 1–5 February: 1st Ranking Series: 2023 Grand Prix Zagreb Open in  Zagreb
Men's Freestyle
 Men's 57 kg winner:  Aliabbas Rzazade
 Men's 61 kg winner:  Reza Atri
 Men's 65 kg winner:  Tömör-Ochiryn Tulga
 Men's 70 kg winner:  Alec Pantaleo
 Men's 74 kg winner:  Jason Nolf
 Men's 79 kg winner:  Ali Savadkouhi
 Men's 86 kg winner:  Hassan Yazdani
 Men's 92 kg winner:  Kollin Moore
 Men's 97 kg winner:  Kyle Snyder
 Men's 125 kg winner:  Amir Hossein Zare
Men's Greco Roman
 Men's 55 kg winner:  Pouya Dadmarz 
 Men's 60 kg winner:  Mehdi Mohsennejad
 Men's 63 kg winner:  Taleh Mammadov 
 Men's 67 kg winner:  Husiyuetu
 Men's 72 kg winner:  Selçuk Can
 Men's 77 kg winner:  Mohammad Ali Geraei
 Men's 82 kg winner:  Alireza Mohmadipiani 
 Men's 87 kg winner:  István Takács
 Men's 97 kg winner:  Kiril Milov 
 Men's 130 kg winner:  Óscar Pino 
Women's
 Women's 50 kg winner:  Yui Susaki
 Women's 53 kg winner:  Akari Fujinami
 Women's 55 kg winner:  Moe Kiyooka
 Women's 57 kg winner:  Sae Nanjo
 Women's 59 kg winner:  Anastasia Nichita
 Women's 62 kg winner:  Sakura Motoki
 Women's 65 kg winner:  Mahiro Yoshitake
 Women's 68 kg winner:  Koumba Larroque
 Women's 72 kg winner:  Skylar Grote
 Women's 76 kg winner:  Yelena Makoyed
 23–26 June: 2nd Ranking Series: 2023 Ibrahim Moustafa Tournament in  Alexandria
Men's Freestyle
 Men's 57 kg winner:  Süleyman Atlı
 Men's 61 kg winner:  Taiyrbek Zhumashbek Uulu
 Men's 65 kg winner:  Vazgen Tevanyan
 Men's 70 kg winner:  Ernazar Akmataliev
 Men's 74 kg winner:  Iakub Shikhdzamalov
 Men's 79 kg winner:  Avtandil Kentchadze
 Men's 86 kg winner:  Vasyl Mykhailov
 Men's 92 kg winner:  Kollin Moore
 Men's 97 kg winner:  Batyrbek Tsakulov
 Men's 125 kg winner:  Taha Akgül
Men's Greco Roman
 Men's 55 kg winner:  Amangali Bekbolatov
 Men's 60 kg winner:  Kerem Kamal 
 Men's 63 kg winner:  Meisam Dalkhani 
 Men's 67 kg winner:  Merey Bekenov
 Men's 72 kg winner:  Ramaz Zoidze
 Men's 77 kg winner:  Aik Mnatsakanian
 Men's 82 kg winner:  Gela Bolkvadze 
 Men's 87 kg winner:  Lasha Gobadze 
 Men's 97 kg winner:  Mohammad Hadi Saravi 
 Men's 130 kg winner:  Abdellatif Mohamed 
Women's
 Women's 50 kg winner:  Ziqi Feng
 Women's 53 kg winner:  Lucía Yépez
 Women's 55 kg winner:  Jacarra Winchester
 Women's 57 kg winner:  Alexandria Town
 Women's 59 kg winner:  Yuliya Tkach
 Women's 62 kg winner:  Aisuluu Tynybekova
 Women's 65 kg winner:  Tetiana Rizhko
 Women's 68 kg winner:  Forrest Molinari
 Women's 72 kg winner:  Dalma Caneva
 Women's 76 kg winner:  Kennedy Blades
 1–4 June: 3rd Ranking Series: 2023 Kaba Uulu Kozhomkul & Raatbek Sanatbaev Tournament in  Bishkek
 13–16 July: 4th Ranking Series: 2023 Hungarian Grand Prix – Polyák Imre Memorial Tournament in  Budapest

2023 Wrestling International tournament
 14 January: 2023 Herman Kare Tournament in  Kouvola
 Men's 60 kg winner:  Mathias Martinetti
 Men's 67 kg winner:  Nestori Mannila
 Men's 72 kg winner:  Michael Portmann
 Men's 77 kg winner:  Akseli Yli-Hannuksela
 Men's 82 kg winner:  Jonni Sarkkinen
 Men's 87 kg winner:  Waltteri Latvala
 Men's 97 kg winner:  Robin Uspenski
 Men's 130 kg winner:  Eerik Pank
 20–22 January: Grand Prix de France Henri Deglane 2023 in  Nice
Men's Freestyle
 Men's 57 kg winner:  Nick Suriano
 Men's 61 kg winner:  Austin DeSanto
 Men's 65 kg winner:  Patricio Lugo
 Men's 70 kg winner:  Alec Pantaleo
 Men's 74 kg winner:  Joseph Lavallee
 Men's 79 kg winner:  Evan Wick
 Men's 86 kg winner:  Ruslan Valiev
 Men's 97 kg winner:  Merab Suleimanishvili
 Men's 125 kg winner:  Nika Berulava
Men's Greco Roman
 Men's 55 kg winner:  Akaki Osiashvili
 Men's 60 kg winner:  Pridon Abuladze
 Men's 63 kg winner:  Aleksandrs Jurkjans
 Men's 67 kg winner:  Luis Orta
 Men's 72 kg winner:  Ibrahim Ghanim
 Men's 77 kg winner:  Serhii Kozub
 Men's 82 kg winner:  Yaroslav Filchakov
 Men's 87 kg winner:  Zhan Beleniuk
 Men's 97 kg winner:  Vladlen Kozliuk
 Men's 130 kg winner:  Óscar Pino
Women's
 Women's 50 kg winner:  Christianah Ogunsanya
 Women's 53 kg winner:  Anastasia Blayvas
 Women's 57 kg winner:  Elena Brugger
 Women's 62 kg winner:  Ana Godinez
 Women's 65 kg winner:  Taybe Yusein
 Women's 68 kg winner:  Koumba Larroque
 Women's 72 kg winner:  Lilly Schneider
 Women's 76 kg winner:  Elmira Syzdykova
 17–19 February: 2023 Klippan Lady Open in  Klippan
Women's
 Women's 50 kg winner:  Mihoko Takeuchi
 Women's 53 kg winner:  Jonna Malmgren
 Women's 55 kg winner:  Diana Weicker
 Women's 59 kg winner:  Othelie Høie
 Women's 62 kg winner:  Suzu Sasaki
 Women's 65 kg winner:  Elleni Johnson
 Women's 68 kg winner:  Olivia Di Bacco
 Women's 76 kg winner:  Erica Wiebe

 2–5 March: 2023 Dan Kolov & Nikola Petrov Tournament in  Sofia
Men's Freestyle
 Men's 57 kg winner:  Ahmet Duman
 Men's 61 kg winner:  Recep Topal
 Men's 65 kg winner:  Kotaro Kiyooka
 Men's 70 kg winner:  Ramazan Ramazanov
 Men's 74 kg winner:  Murad Kuramagomedov
 Men's 79 kg winner:  Mostafa Ghiyasicheka
 Men's 86 kg winner:  Hadi Vafaeipour
 Men's 92 kg winner:  Arashk Mohebi
 Men's 97 kg winner:  Kyle Snyder
 Men's 125 kg winner:  Giorgi Meshvildishvili
Men's Greco Roman
 Men's 55 kg winner:  Adem Uzun 
 Men's 60 kg winner:  Zholaman Sharshenbekov
 Men's 63 kg winner:  Abu Muslim Amaev
 Men's 67 kg winner:  Slavik Galstyan
 Men's 72 kg winner:  Shahin Mofrad
 Men's 77 kg winner:  Akzhol Makhmudov
 Men's 82 kg winner:  Exauce Mukubu 
 Men's 87 kg winner:  Semen Novikov
 Men's 97 kg winner:  Felix Baldauf 
 Men's 130 kg winner:  Morteza Alghosi 
Women's
 Women's 50 kg winner:  Mariya Stadnik
 Women's 53 kg winner:  Yumi Shimono
 Women's 55 kg winner:  Akari Fujinami
 Women's 57 kg winner:  Luisa Valverde
 Women's 59 kg winner:  Sara Natami
 Women's 62 kg winner:  Yuzuka Inagaki
 Women's 65 kg winner:  Naomi Ruike
 Women's 68 kg winner:  Yuliana Yaneva
 Women's 72 kg winner:  Maria Larisa Nitu
 Women's 76 kg winner:  Yasemin Adar
 24–25 March: 2023 Thor Masters Tournament in  Nykobing Falster
 1–2 April: 2023 Kristjan Palusalu Memorial Tournament in  Tallinn
 15–16 April: 2023 Flatz Austria Open in  Wolfurt
 21–23 April: 2023 Tournoi International de la Ville d'Abidjan in  Abidjan
 22–23 April: 2023 Indian Ocean Friendship Tournament in  Mauritius
 12–15 May: 2023 Muhamet Malo Tournament in  Tirana
 2–3 June: 2023 Pat Shaw Memorial Tournament in  Guatemala City
 9–10 June: 2023 Macedonian Pearl Tournament in  Skopje
 9–10 June: 2023 Sassari City Matteo Pellicone Memorial Tournament in  Sassari
 17–18 June: 2023 Druskininkai Cup in  Druskininkai
 21–25 June: 2023 Yasar Dogu Tournament and 2023 Vehbi Emre & Hamit Kaplan Tournament in  Istanbul
 7–9 July: 2023 Grand Prix of Spain in  Madrid
 27–30 July: 2023 Ziolkowski, Pytlasinski, Poland Open in  Warsaw
 4 August: 2023 Ljubomir Ivanovic Gedza Memorial Tournament in  Mladenovac
 11–13 August: 2023 Grand Prix of Germany in  Dortmund
 17–20 August: 2023 Ion Cornianu & Ladislau Simon Tournament in  Bucharest
 2–6 November: 2023 Kunayev D.A. Tournament in  Taraz City
 9–11 November: 2023 Mediterranean Championships in  Alexandria

References

 
Sports by year